

428001–428100 

|-bgcolor=#E9E9E9
| 428001 ||  || — || January 23, 2006 || Kitt Peak || Spacewatch || — || align=right | 2.0 km || 
|-id=002 bgcolor=#E9E9E9
| 428002 ||  || — || January 23, 2006 || Mount Lemmon || Mount Lemmon Survey || — || align=right | 1.4 km || 
|-id=003 bgcolor=#E9E9E9
| 428003 ||  || — || December 6, 2005 || Mount Lemmon || Mount Lemmon Survey || — || align=right | 1.4 km || 
|-id=004 bgcolor=#E9E9E9
| 428004 ||  || — || January 23, 2006 || Kitt Peak || Spacewatch || MAR || align=right | 1.1 km || 
|-id=005 bgcolor=#E9E9E9
| 428005 ||  || — || January 23, 2006 || Kitt Peak || Spacewatch || — || align=right | 1.6 km || 
|-id=006 bgcolor=#E9E9E9
| 428006 ||  || — || December 5, 2005 || Mount Lemmon || Mount Lemmon Survey || — || align=right | 1.3 km || 
|-id=007 bgcolor=#E9E9E9
| 428007 ||  || — || January 25, 2006 || Kitt Peak || Spacewatch || — || align=right | 2.5 km || 
|-id=008 bgcolor=#E9E9E9
| 428008 ||  || — || January 26, 2006 || Catalina || CSS || MAR || align=right | 1.3 km || 
|-id=009 bgcolor=#E9E9E9
| 428009 ||  || — || January 25, 2006 || Kitt Peak || Spacewatch || — || align=right | 1.4 km || 
|-id=010 bgcolor=#E9E9E9
| 428010 ||  || — || January 25, 2006 || Kitt Peak || Spacewatch || NEM || align=right | 1.7 km || 
|-id=011 bgcolor=#E9E9E9
| 428011 ||  || — || October 7, 2005 || Mount Lemmon || Mount Lemmon Survey || GEF || align=right | 1.4 km || 
|-id=012 bgcolor=#E9E9E9
| 428012 ||  || — || January 26, 2006 || Kitt Peak || Spacewatch || — || align=right | 1.6 km || 
|-id=013 bgcolor=#E9E9E9
| 428013 ||  || — || January 26, 2006 || Kitt Peak || Spacewatch || EUN || align=right | 1.1 km || 
|-id=014 bgcolor=#E9E9E9
| 428014 ||  || — || January 27, 2006 || Mount Lemmon || Mount Lemmon Survey || — || align=right | 1.4 km || 
|-id=015 bgcolor=#E9E9E9
| 428015 ||  || — || January 28, 2006 || Mount Lemmon || Mount Lemmon Survey || — || align=right | 1.9 km || 
|-id=016 bgcolor=#E9E9E9
| 428016 ||  || — || January 25, 2006 || Kitt Peak || Spacewatch || GEF || align=right | 1.4 km || 
|-id=017 bgcolor=#E9E9E9
| 428017 ||  || — || January 26, 2006 || Kitt Peak || Spacewatch || — || align=right | 1.5 km || 
|-id=018 bgcolor=#E9E9E9
| 428018 ||  || — || January 26, 2006 || Kitt Peak || Spacewatch || — || align=right | 1.4 km || 
|-id=019 bgcolor=#E9E9E9
| 428019 ||  || — || December 5, 2005 || Mount Lemmon || Mount Lemmon Survey || — || align=right | 1.9 km || 
|-id=020 bgcolor=#E9E9E9
| 428020 ||  || — || January 28, 2006 || Mount Lemmon || Mount Lemmon Survey || — || align=right | 1.8 km || 
|-id=021 bgcolor=#E9E9E9
| 428021 ||  || — || January 28, 2006 || Kitt Peak || Spacewatch || — || align=right | 1.6 km || 
|-id=022 bgcolor=#E9E9E9
| 428022 ||  || — || January 31, 2006 || Kitt Peak || Spacewatch || — || align=right | 1.2 km || 
|-id=023 bgcolor=#E9E9E9
| 428023 ||  || — || January 31, 2006 || Kitt Peak || Spacewatch || AEO || align=right | 1.0 km || 
|-id=024 bgcolor=#E9E9E9
| 428024 ||  || — || January 31, 2006 || Kitt Peak || Spacewatch || — || align=right | 1.2 km || 
|-id=025 bgcolor=#E9E9E9
| 428025 ||  || — || January 31, 2006 || Kitt Peak || Spacewatch || AGN || align=right | 1.1 km || 
|-id=026 bgcolor=#E9E9E9
| 428026 ||  || — || January 30, 2006 || Kitt Peak || Spacewatch || — || align=right | 1.4 km || 
|-id=027 bgcolor=#E9E9E9
| 428027 ||  || — || January 26, 2006 || Kitt Peak || Spacewatch || AEO || align=right data-sort-value="0.88" | 880 m || 
|-id=028 bgcolor=#E9E9E9
| 428028 ||  || — || December 22, 2005 || Kitt Peak || Spacewatch || — || align=right | 2.0 km || 
|-id=029 bgcolor=#E9E9E9
| 428029 ||  || — || January 23, 2006 || Kitt Peak || Spacewatch || AEO || align=right | 1.1 km || 
|-id=030 bgcolor=#E9E9E9
| 428030 ||  || — || February 1, 2006 || Kitt Peak || Spacewatch || — || align=right | 1.4 km || 
|-id=031 bgcolor=#E9E9E9
| 428031 ||  || — || January 25, 2006 || Kitt Peak || Spacewatch || PAD || align=right | 1.8 km || 
|-id=032 bgcolor=#E9E9E9
| 428032 ||  || — || February 6, 2006 || Catalina || CSS || — || align=right | 2.3 km || 
|-id=033 bgcolor=#E9E9E9
| 428033 ||  || — || January 26, 2006 || Kitt Peak || Spacewatch || — || align=right | 2.8 km || 
|-id=034 bgcolor=#E9E9E9
| 428034 ||  || — || February 1, 2006 || Kitt Peak || Spacewatch || — || align=right | 2.3 km || 
|-id=035 bgcolor=#E9E9E9
| 428035 ||  || — || February 1, 2006 || Kitt Peak || Spacewatch || — || align=right | 1.9 km || 
|-id=036 bgcolor=#E9E9E9
| 428036 ||  || — || February 20, 2006 || Kitt Peak || Spacewatch || — || align=right | 2.6 km || 
|-id=037 bgcolor=#E9E9E9
| 428037 ||  || — || February 20, 2006 || Kitt Peak || Spacewatch || — || align=right | 1.8 km || 
|-id=038 bgcolor=#E9E9E9
| 428038 ||  || — || February 20, 2006 || Kitt Peak || Spacewatch || — || align=right | 3.4 km || 
|-id=039 bgcolor=#E9E9E9
| 428039 ||  || — || February 7, 2006 || Mount Lemmon || Mount Lemmon Survey || — || align=right | 2.5 km || 
|-id=040 bgcolor=#E9E9E9
| 428040 ||  || — || January 31, 2006 || Kitt Peak || Spacewatch || — || align=right | 1.7 km || 
|-id=041 bgcolor=#E9E9E9
| 428041 ||  || — || February 21, 2006 || Mount Lemmon || Mount Lemmon Survey || — || align=right | 2.1 km || 
|-id=042 bgcolor=#E9E9E9
| 428042 ||  || — || February 24, 2006 || Kitt Peak || Spacewatch || — || align=right | 1.9 km || 
|-id=043 bgcolor=#E9E9E9
| 428043 ||  || — || January 7, 2006 || Mount Lemmon || Mount Lemmon Survey || — || align=right | 2.8 km || 
|-id=044 bgcolor=#E9E9E9
| 428044 ||  || — || February 24, 2006 || Mount Lemmon || Mount Lemmon Survey || — || align=right | 2.3 km || 
|-id=045 bgcolor=#E9E9E9
| 428045 ||  || — || February 27, 2006 || Kitt Peak || Spacewatch || — || align=right | 2.2 km || 
|-id=046 bgcolor=#E9E9E9
| 428046 ||  || — || January 26, 2006 || Mount Lemmon || Mount Lemmon Survey || EUN || align=right | 1.4 km || 
|-id=047 bgcolor=#E9E9E9
| 428047 ||  || — || February 1, 2006 || Kitt Peak || Spacewatch || AGN || align=right | 1.3 km || 
|-id=048 bgcolor=#E9E9E9
| 428048 ||  || — || February 25, 2006 || Mount Lemmon || Mount Lemmon Survey || — || align=right | 2.0 km || 
|-id=049 bgcolor=#E9E9E9
| 428049 ||  || — || February 25, 2006 || Kitt Peak || Spacewatch || — || align=right | 2.0 km || 
|-id=050 bgcolor=#E9E9E9
| 428050 ||  || — || February 25, 2006 || Kitt Peak || Spacewatch || — || align=right | 2.6 km || 
|-id=051 bgcolor=#E9E9E9
| 428051 ||  || — || February 27, 2006 || Kitt Peak || Spacewatch || — || align=right | 2.0 km || 
|-id=052 bgcolor=#E9E9E9
| 428052 ||  || — || February 27, 2006 || Kitt Peak || Spacewatch || DOR || align=right | 2.9 km || 
|-id=053 bgcolor=#E9E9E9
| 428053 ||  || — || February 24, 2006 || Catalina || CSS || — || align=right | 2.3 km || 
|-id=054 bgcolor=#E9E9E9
| 428054 ||  || — || January 6, 2006 || Mount Lemmon || Mount Lemmon Survey || — || align=right | 2.4 km || 
|-id=055 bgcolor=#E9E9E9
| 428055 ||  || — || February 21, 2006 || Anderson Mesa || LONEOS || — || align=right | 1.9 km || 
|-id=056 bgcolor=#E9E9E9
| 428056 ||  || — || March 2, 2006 || Kitt Peak || Spacewatch || — || align=right | 2.1 km || 
|-id=057 bgcolor=#E9E9E9
| 428057 ||  || — || January 8, 2006 || Mount Lemmon || Mount Lemmon Survey || DOR || align=right | 2.4 km || 
|-id=058 bgcolor=#E9E9E9
| 428058 ||  || — || March 2, 2006 || Kitt Peak || Spacewatch || — || align=right | 1.4 km || 
|-id=059 bgcolor=#E9E9E9
| 428059 ||  || — || March 2, 2006 || Kitt Peak || Spacewatch || — || align=right | 1.8 km || 
|-id=060 bgcolor=#E9E9E9
| 428060 ||  || — || March 2, 2006 || Kitt Peak || Spacewatch || — || align=right | 2.0 km || 
|-id=061 bgcolor=#E9E9E9
| 428061 ||  || — || February 2, 2006 || Kitt Peak || Spacewatch || — || align=right | 2.4 km || 
|-id=062 bgcolor=#E9E9E9
| 428062 ||  || — || March 4, 2006 || Kitt Peak || Spacewatch || HOF || align=right | 2.1 km || 
|-id=063 bgcolor=#E9E9E9
| 428063 ||  || — || March 3, 2006 || Mount Lemmon || Mount Lemmon Survey || — || align=right | 2.2 km || 
|-id=064 bgcolor=#E9E9E9
| 428064 ||  || — || March 5, 2006 || Kitt Peak || Spacewatch || — || align=right | 1.7 km || 
|-id=065 bgcolor=#E9E9E9
| 428065 ||  || — || January 26, 2006 || Mount Lemmon || Mount Lemmon Survey || AGN || align=right | 1.1 km || 
|-id=066 bgcolor=#E9E9E9
| 428066 ||  || — || March 4, 2006 || Mount Lemmon || Mount Lemmon Survey || — || align=right | 2.5 km || 
|-id=067 bgcolor=#E9E9E9
| 428067 ||  || — || April 7, 2006 || Wrightwood || J. W. Young || — || align=right | 2.2 km || 
|-id=068 bgcolor=#E9E9E9
| 428068 ||  || — || April 2, 2006 || Kitt Peak || Spacewatch || — || align=right | 2.1 km || 
|-id=069 bgcolor=#E9E9E9
| 428069 ||  || — || March 2, 2006 || Kitt Peak || Spacewatch || — || align=right | 2.2 km || 
|-id=070 bgcolor=#E9E9E9
| 428070 ||  || — || April 20, 2006 || Kitt Peak || Spacewatch || — || align=right | 2.2 km || 
|-id=071 bgcolor=#E9E9E9
| 428071 ||  || — || April 25, 2006 || Kitt Peak || Spacewatch || — || align=right | 1.7 km || 
|-id=072 bgcolor=#E9E9E9
| 428072 ||  || — || April 2, 2006 || Catalina || CSS || — || align=right | 3.2 km || 
|-id=073 bgcolor=#E9E9E9
| 428073 ||  || — || April 18, 2006 || Catalina || CSS || — || align=right | 2.5 km || 
|-id=074 bgcolor=#d6d6d6
| 428074 ||  || — || April 25, 2006 || Kitt Peak || Spacewatch || — || align=right | 2.3 km || 
|-id=075 bgcolor=#E9E9E9
| 428075 ||  || — || April 30, 2006 || Kitt Peak || Spacewatch || GEF || align=right | 1.4 km || 
|-id=076 bgcolor=#d6d6d6
| 428076 ||  || — || April 20, 2006 || Kitt Peak || Spacewatch || — || align=right | 2.2 km || 
|-id=077 bgcolor=#E9E9E9
| 428077 ||  || — || February 27, 2006 || Kitt Peak || Spacewatch || — || align=right | 2.0 km || 
|-id=078 bgcolor=#d6d6d6
| 428078 ||  || — || April 20, 2006 || Kitt Peak || Spacewatch || — || align=right | 3.3 km || 
|-id=079 bgcolor=#E9E9E9
| 428079 ||  || — || May 5, 2006 || Anderson Mesa || LONEOS || — || align=right | 2.3 km || 
|-id=080 bgcolor=#E9E9E9
| 428080 ||  || — || May 9, 2006 || Mount Lemmon || Mount Lemmon Survey || — || align=right | 2.4 km || 
|-id=081 bgcolor=#fefefe
| 428081 ||  || — || May 8, 2006 || Mount Lemmon || Mount Lemmon Survey || — || align=right data-sort-value="0.77" | 770 m || 
|-id=082 bgcolor=#E9E9E9
| 428082 ||  || — || May 20, 2006 || Kitt Peak || Spacewatch || — || align=right | 1.8 km || 
|-id=083 bgcolor=#d6d6d6
| 428083 ||  || — || November 19, 2003 || Kitt Peak || Spacewatch || KOR || align=right | 1.6 km || 
|-id=084 bgcolor=#d6d6d6
| 428084 ||  || — || May 22, 2006 || Kitt Peak || Spacewatch || — || align=right | 2.1 km || 
|-id=085 bgcolor=#E9E9E9
| 428085 ||  || — || May 26, 2006 || Mount Lemmon || Mount Lemmon Survey || — || align=right | 2.5 km || 
|-id=086 bgcolor=#FFC2E0
| 428086 || 2006 NM || — || July 3, 2006 || Siding Spring || SSS || AMO +1km || align=right | 2.0 km || 
|-id=087 bgcolor=#d6d6d6
| 428087 ||  || — || July 24, 2006 || Hibiscus || S. F. Hönig || Tj (2.98) || align=right | 3.4 km || 
|-id=088 bgcolor=#FA8072
| 428088 ||  || — || July 18, 2006 || Mount Lemmon || Mount Lemmon Survey || — || align=right data-sort-value="0.82" | 820 m || 
|-id=089 bgcolor=#d6d6d6
| 428089 ||  || — || August 15, 2006 || Palomar || NEAT || — || align=right | 4.6 km || 
|-id=090 bgcolor=#FA8072
| 428090 ||  || — || August 15, 2006 || Siding Spring || SSS || — || align=right data-sort-value="0.99" | 990 m || 
|-id=091 bgcolor=#fefefe
| 428091 ||  || — || August 18, 2006 || Kitt Peak || Spacewatch || — || align=right | 1.2 km || 
|-id=092 bgcolor=#d6d6d6
| 428092 ||  || — || August 18, 2006 || Vicques || M. Ory || — || align=right | 5.2 km || 
|-id=093 bgcolor=#fefefe
| 428093 ||  || — || August 17, 2006 || Palomar || NEAT || — || align=right data-sort-value="0.73" | 730 m || 
|-id=094 bgcolor=#d6d6d6
| 428094 ||  || — || June 21, 2006 || Catalina || CSS || — || align=right | 3.4 km || 
|-id=095 bgcolor=#d6d6d6
| 428095 ||  || — || August 19, 2006 || Anderson Mesa || LONEOS || — || align=right | 3.2 km || 
|-id=096 bgcolor=#d6d6d6
| 428096 ||  || — || August 24, 2006 || Socorro || LINEAR || — || align=right | 4.4 km || 
|-id=097 bgcolor=#d6d6d6
| 428097 ||  || — || August 27, 2006 || Kitt Peak || Spacewatch || — || align=right | 3.7 km || 
|-id=098 bgcolor=#d6d6d6
| 428098 ||  || — || August 21, 2006 || Kitt Peak || Spacewatch || — || align=right | 3.2 km || 
|-id=099 bgcolor=#fefefe
| 428099 ||  || — || August 16, 2006 || Palomar || NEAT || — || align=right | 1.0 km || 
|-id=100 bgcolor=#d6d6d6
| 428100 ||  || — || August 22, 2006 || Palomar || NEAT || Tj (2.99) || align=right | 4.5 km || 
|}

428101–428200 

|-bgcolor=#d6d6d6
| 428101 ||  || — || August 27, 2006 || Anderson Mesa || LONEOS || — || align=right | 3.7 km || 
|-id=102 bgcolor=#fefefe
| 428102 Rolandwagner ||  ||  || August 30, 2006 || Saint-Sulpice || B. Christophe || — || align=right data-sort-value="0.70" | 700 m || 
|-id=103 bgcolor=#fefefe
| 428103 ||  || — || August 21, 2006 || Kitt Peak || Spacewatch || — || align=right data-sort-value="0.76" | 760 m || 
|-id=104 bgcolor=#fefefe
| 428104 ||  || — || August 18, 2006 || Kitt Peak || Spacewatch || — || align=right data-sort-value="0.76" | 760 m || 
|-id=105 bgcolor=#fefefe
| 428105 ||  || — || August 29, 2006 || Anderson Mesa || LONEOS || H || align=right data-sort-value="0.67" | 670 m || 
|-id=106 bgcolor=#fefefe
| 428106 ||  || — || August 28, 2006 || Catalina || CSS || — || align=right data-sort-value="0.63" | 630 m || 
|-id=107 bgcolor=#fefefe
| 428107 ||  || — || September 14, 2006 || Catalina || CSS || — || align=right data-sort-value="0.89" | 890 m || 
|-id=108 bgcolor=#fefefe
| 428108 ||  || — || September 12, 2006 || Catalina || CSS || — || align=right data-sort-value="0.75" | 750 m || 
|-id=109 bgcolor=#fefefe
| 428109 ||  || — || September 15, 2006 || Kitt Peak || Spacewatch || — || align=right data-sort-value="0.99" | 990 m || 
|-id=110 bgcolor=#d6d6d6
| 428110 ||  || — || September 14, 2006 || Kitt Peak || Spacewatch || — || align=right | 3.1 km || 
|-id=111 bgcolor=#d6d6d6
| 428111 ||  || — || July 21, 2006 || Mount Lemmon || Mount Lemmon Survey || — || align=right | 3.1 km || 
|-id=112 bgcolor=#fefefe
| 428112 ||  || — || September 14, 2006 || Kitt Peak || Spacewatch || — || align=right data-sort-value="0.70" | 700 m || 
|-id=113 bgcolor=#fefefe
| 428113 ||  || — || September 14, 2006 || Kitt Peak || Spacewatch || V || align=right data-sort-value="0.45" | 450 m || 
|-id=114 bgcolor=#d6d6d6
| 428114 ||  || — || September 15, 2006 || Kitt Peak || Spacewatch || THM || align=right | 2.4 km || 
|-id=115 bgcolor=#d6d6d6
| 428115 ||  || — || September 15, 2006 || Kitt Peak || Spacewatch || — || align=right | 2.9 km || 
|-id=116 bgcolor=#FA8072
| 428116 ||  || — || September 15, 2006 || Kitt Peak || Spacewatch || — || align=right data-sort-value="0.82" | 820 m || 
|-id=117 bgcolor=#fefefe
| 428117 ||  || — || September 15, 2006 || Kitt Peak || Spacewatch || — || align=right data-sort-value="0.71" | 710 m || 
|-id=118 bgcolor=#d6d6d6
| 428118 ||  || — || September 14, 2006 || Catalina || CSS || — || align=right | 4.2 km || 
|-id=119 bgcolor=#d6d6d6
| 428119 ||  || — || September 11, 2006 || Apache Point || A. C. Becker || (1118) || align=right | 3.5 km || 
|-id=120 bgcolor=#fefefe
| 428120 ||  || — || September 14, 2006 || Mauna Kea || J. Masiero || — || align=right data-sort-value="0.74" | 740 m || 
|-id=121 bgcolor=#fefefe
| 428121 ||  || — || September 14, 2006 || Mauna Kea || J. Masiero || — || align=right data-sort-value="0.65" | 650 m || 
|-id=122 bgcolor=#FA8072
| 428122 ||  || — || September 16, 2006 || Catalina || CSS || H || align=right data-sort-value="0.62" | 620 m || 
|-id=123 bgcolor=#fefefe
| 428123 ||  || — || August 30, 2006 || Anderson Mesa || LONEOS || — || align=right data-sort-value="0.91" | 910 m || 
|-id=124 bgcolor=#fefefe
| 428124 ||  || — || July 22, 2006 || Mount Lemmon || Mount Lemmon Survey || — || align=right data-sort-value="0.93" | 930 m || 
|-id=125 bgcolor=#fefefe
| 428125 ||  || — || September 18, 2006 || Anderson Mesa || LONEOS || — || align=right data-sort-value="0.88" | 880 m || 
|-id=126 bgcolor=#d6d6d6
| 428126 ||  || — || September 18, 2006 || Anderson Mesa || LONEOS || — || align=right | 5.9 km || 
|-id=127 bgcolor=#fefefe
| 428127 ||  || — || September 19, 2006 || Anderson Mesa || LONEOS || — || align=right data-sort-value="0.73" | 730 m || 
|-id=128 bgcolor=#d6d6d6
| 428128 ||  || — || September 19, 2006 || Kitt Peak || Spacewatch || — || align=right | 3.7 km || 
|-id=129 bgcolor=#d6d6d6
| 428129 ||  || — || September 19, 2006 || Kitt Peak || Spacewatch || — || align=right | 2.9 km || 
|-id=130 bgcolor=#fefefe
| 428130 ||  || — || September 19, 2006 || Kitt Peak || Spacewatch || MAS || align=right data-sort-value="0.64" | 640 m || 
|-id=131 bgcolor=#fefefe
| 428131 ||  || — || September 19, 2006 || Kitt Peak || Spacewatch || — || align=right data-sort-value="0.76" | 760 m || 
|-id=132 bgcolor=#fefefe
| 428132 ||  || — || September 19, 2006 || Kitt Peak || Spacewatch || — || align=right data-sort-value="0.63" | 630 m || 
|-id=133 bgcolor=#fefefe
| 428133 ||  || — || September 18, 2006 || Kitt Peak || Spacewatch || — || align=right data-sort-value="0.69" | 690 m || 
|-id=134 bgcolor=#d6d6d6
| 428134 ||  || — || September 18, 2006 || Kitt Peak || Spacewatch || HYG || align=right | 2.6 km || 
|-id=135 bgcolor=#d6d6d6
| 428135 ||  || — || September 19, 2006 || Kitt Peak || Spacewatch || — || align=right | 3.6 km || 
|-id=136 bgcolor=#d6d6d6
| 428136 ||  || — || September 19, 2006 || Kitt Peak || Spacewatch || — || align=right | 4.0 km || 
|-id=137 bgcolor=#d6d6d6
| 428137 ||  || — || February 29, 2004 || Kitt Peak || Spacewatch || — || align=right | 3.8 km || 
|-id=138 bgcolor=#fefefe
| 428138 ||  || — || September 19, 2006 || Catalina || CSS || — || align=right data-sort-value="0.84" | 840 m || 
|-id=139 bgcolor=#fefefe
| 428139 ||  || — || September 16, 2006 || Catalina || CSS || — || align=right data-sort-value="0.85" | 850 m || 
|-id=140 bgcolor=#d6d6d6
| 428140 ||  || — || September 19, 2006 || Kitt Peak || Spacewatch || HYG || align=right | 2.8 km || 
|-id=141 bgcolor=#d6d6d6
| 428141 ||  || — || September 23, 2006 || Kitt Peak || Spacewatch || — || align=right | 3.2 km || 
|-id=142 bgcolor=#d6d6d6
| 428142 ||  || — || September 23, 2006 || Kitt Peak || Spacewatch || — || align=right | 2.5 km || 
|-id=143 bgcolor=#d6d6d6
| 428143 ||  || — || September 17, 2006 || Catalina || CSS || — || align=right | 3.3 km || 
|-id=144 bgcolor=#d6d6d6
| 428144 ||  || — || September 25, 2006 || Kitt Peak || Spacewatch || — || align=right | 5.1 km || 
|-id=145 bgcolor=#d6d6d6
| 428145 ||  || — || September 25, 2006 || Kitt Peak || Spacewatch || — || align=right | 4.8 km || 
|-id=146 bgcolor=#d6d6d6
| 428146 ||  || — || September 25, 2006 || Kitt Peak || Spacewatch || — || align=right | 2.8 km || 
|-id=147 bgcolor=#fefefe
| 428147 ||  || — || September 25, 2006 || Kitt Peak || Spacewatch || NYS || align=right data-sort-value="0.56" | 560 m || 
|-id=148 bgcolor=#fefefe
| 428148 ||  || — || September 25, 2006 || Mount Lemmon || Mount Lemmon Survey || H || align=right data-sort-value="0.82" | 820 m || 
|-id=149 bgcolor=#fefefe
| 428149 ||  || — || September 27, 2006 || Kitt Peak || Spacewatch || NYS || align=right data-sort-value="0.58" | 580 m || 
|-id=150 bgcolor=#d6d6d6
| 428150 ||  || — || September 25, 2006 || Mount Lemmon || Mount Lemmon Survey || — || align=right | 3.5 km || 
|-id=151 bgcolor=#d6d6d6
| 428151 ||  || — || September 26, 2006 || Kitt Peak || Spacewatch || — || align=right | 2.5 km || 
|-id=152 bgcolor=#fefefe
| 428152 ||  || — || August 18, 2006 || Kitt Peak || Spacewatch || — || align=right data-sort-value="0.87" | 870 m || 
|-id=153 bgcolor=#fefefe
| 428153 ||  || — || September 26, 2006 || Mount Lemmon || Mount Lemmon Survey || — || align=right data-sort-value="0.56" | 560 m || 
|-id=154 bgcolor=#fefefe
| 428154 ||  || — || March 11, 2005 || Mount Lemmon || Mount Lemmon Survey || — || align=right data-sort-value="0.59" | 590 m || 
|-id=155 bgcolor=#fefefe
| 428155 ||  || — || September 26, 2006 || Kitt Peak || Spacewatch || — || align=right data-sort-value="0.94" | 940 m || 
|-id=156 bgcolor=#fefefe
| 428156 ||  || — || September 26, 2006 || Kitt Peak || Spacewatch || — || align=right data-sort-value="0.77" | 770 m || 
|-id=157 bgcolor=#fefefe
| 428157 ||  || — || August 27, 2006 || Kitt Peak || Spacewatch || V || align=right data-sort-value="0.53" | 530 m || 
|-id=158 bgcolor=#fefefe
| 428158 ||  || — || September 28, 2006 || Kitt Peak || Spacewatch || V || align=right data-sort-value="0.67" | 670 m || 
|-id=159 bgcolor=#d6d6d6
| 428159 ||  || — || September 19, 2006 || Catalina || CSS || — || align=right | 3.8 km || 
|-id=160 bgcolor=#fefefe
| 428160 ||  || — || September 27, 2006 || Mount Lemmon || Mount Lemmon Survey || — || align=right data-sort-value="0.62" | 620 m || 
|-id=161 bgcolor=#fefefe
| 428161 ||  || — || September 27, 2006 || Kitt Peak || Spacewatch || — || align=right data-sort-value="0.80" | 800 m || 
|-id=162 bgcolor=#d6d6d6
| 428162 ||  || — || September 28, 2006 || Kitt Peak || Spacewatch || 7:4 || align=right | 3.1 km || 
|-id=163 bgcolor=#fefefe
| 428163 ||  || — || September 28, 2006 || Mount Lemmon || Mount Lemmon Survey || H || align=right data-sort-value="0.64" | 640 m || 
|-id=164 bgcolor=#fefefe
| 428164 ||  || — || September 30, 2006 || Mount Lemmon || Mount Lemmon Survey || — || align=right data-sort-value="0.68" | 680 m || 
|-id=165 bgcolor=#fefefe
| 428165 ||  || — || September 30, 2006 || Mount Lemmon || Mount Lemmon Survey || — || align=right data-sort-value="0.83" | 830 m || 
|-id=166 bgcolor=#fefefe
| 428166 ||  || — || September 20, 2006 || Catalina || CSS || — || align=right data-sort-value="0.98" | 980 m || 
|-id=167 bgcolor=#d6d6d6
| 428167 ||  || — || September 16, 2006 || Apache Point || A. C. Becker || — || align=right | 2.5 km || 
|-id=168 bgcolor=#d6d6d6
| 428168 ||  || — || September 29, 2006 || Apache Point || A. C. Becker || — || align=right | 3.0 km || 
|-id=169 bgcolor=#fefefe
| 428169 ||  || — || September 26, 2006 || Mount Lemmon || Mount Lemmon Survey || — || align=right data-sort-value="0.79" | 790 m || 
|-id=170 bgcolor=#fefefe
| 428170 ||  || — || September 17, 2006 || Mauna Kea || J. Masiero || NYS || align=right data-sort-value="0.51" | 510 m || 
|-id=171 bgcolor=#d6d6d6
| 428171 ||  || — || September 16, 2006 || Kitt Peak || Spacewatch || — || align=right | 3.2 km || 
|-id=172 bgcolor=#fefefe
| 428172 ||  || — || September 28, 2006 || Kitt Peak || Spacewatch || MAS || align=right data-sort-value="0.66" | 660 m || 
|-id=173 bgcolor=#fefefe
| 428173 ||  || — || October 11, 2006 || Kitt Peak || Spacewatch || NYS || align=right data-sort-value="0.59" | 590 m || 
|-id=174 bgcolor=#fefefe
| 428174 ||  || — || September 30, 2006 || Mount Lemmon || Mount Lemmon Survey || — || align=right data-sort-value="0.72" | 720 m || 
|-id=175 bgcolor=#fefefe
| 428175 ||  || — || October 12, 2006 || Kitt Peak || Spacewatch || NYS || align=right data-sort-value="0.54" | 540 m || 
|-id=176 bgcolor=#fefefe
| 428176 ||  || — || October 12, 2006 || Kitt Peak || Spacewatch || — || align=right data-sort-value="0.67" | 670 m || 
|-id=177 bgcolor=#fefefe
| 428177 ||  || — || September 30, 2006 || Catalina || CSS || — || align=right data-sort-value="0.80" | 800 m || 
|-id=178 bgcolor=#fefefe
| 428178 ||  || — || October 4, 2006 || Mount Lemmon || Mount Lemmon Survey || — || align=right data-sort-value="0.80" | 800 m || 
|-id=179 bgcolor=#fefefe
| 428179 ||  || — || October 13, 2006 || Kitt Peak || Spacewatch || — || align=right data-sort-value="0.80" | 800 m || 
|-id=180 bgcolor=#d6d6d6
| 428180 ||  || — || October 12, 2006 || Kitt Peak || Spacewatch || — || align=right | 4.8 km || 
|-id=181 bgcolor=#d6d6d6
| 428181 ||  || — || October 1, 2006 || Apache Point || A. C. Becker || — || align=right | 3.4 km || 
|-id=182 bgcolor=#fefefe
| 428182 ||  || — || September 22, 2006 || Catalina || CSS || V || align=right data-sort-value="0.64" | 640 m || 
|-id=183 bgcolor=#fefefe
| 428183 ||  || — || October 16, 2006 || Kitt Peak || Spacewatch || — || align=right data-sort-value="0.59" | 590 m || 
|-id=184 bgcolor=#d6d6d6
| 428184 ||  || — || September 16, 2006 || Catalina || CSS ||  || align=right | 3.6 km || 
|-id=185 bgcolor=#fefefe
| 428185 ||  || — || October 19, 2006 || Mount Lemmon || Mount Lemmon Survey || — || align=right data-sort-value="0.64" | 640 m || 
|-id=186 bgcolor=#d6d6d6
| 428186 ||  || — || October 16, 2006 || Kitt Peak || Spacewatch || — || align=right | 2.8 km || 
|-id=187 bgcolor=#d6d6d6
| 428187 ||  || — || October 17, 2006 || Kitt Peak || Spacewatch || — || align=right | 3.3 km || 
|-id=188 bgcolor=#fefefe
| 428188 ||  || — || September 25, 2006 || Mount Lemmon || Mount Lemmon Survey || MAS || align=right data-sort-value="0.71" | 710 m || 
|-id=189 bgcolor=#fefefe
| 428189 ||  || — || October 17, 2006 || Mount Lemmon || Mount Lemmon Survey || — || align=right data-sort-value="0.76" | 760 m || 
|-id=190 bgcolor=#fefefe
| 428190 ||  || — || October 17, 2006 || Mount Lemmon || Mount Lemmon Survey || NYS || align=right data-sort-value="0.43" | 430 m || 
|-id=191 bgcolor=#fefefe
| 428191 ||  || — || October 2, 2006 || Mount Lemmon || Mount Lemmon Survey || — || align=right data-sort-value="0.81" | 810 m || 
|-id=192 bgcolor=#d6d6d6
| 428192 ||  || — || October 19, 2006 || Kitt Peak || Spacewatch || — || align=right | 5.1 km || 
|-id=193 bgcolor=#fefefe
| 428193 ||  || — || October 19, 2006 || Kitt Peak || Spacewatch || NYS || align=right data-sort-value="0.68" | 680 m || 
|-id=194 bgcolor=#fefefe
| 428194 ||  || — || October 19, 2006 || Kitt Peak || Spacewatch || — || align=right data-sort-value="0.69" | 690 m || 
|-id=195 bgcolor=#fefefe
| 428195 ||  || — || October 19, 2006 || Kitt Peak || Spacewatch || — || align=right data-sort-value="0.79" | 790 m || 
|-id=196 bgcolor=#d6d6d6
| 428196 ||  || — || October 21, 2006 || Catalina || CSS || — || align=right | 3.4 km || 
|-id=197 bgcolor=#d6d6d6
| 428197 ||  || — || October 2, 2006 || Mount Lemmon || Mount Lemmon Survey || 7:4 || align=right | 2.6 km || 
|-id=198 bgcolor=#fefefe
| 428198 ||  || — || October 2, 2006 || Mount Lemmon || Mount Lemmon Survey || — || align=right data-sort-value="0.65" | 650 m || 
|-id=199 bgcolor=#d6d6d6
| 428199 ||  || — || October 21, 2006 || Mount Lemmon || Mount Lemmon Survey || — || align=right | 3.9 km || 
|-id=200 bgcolor=#d6d6d6
| 428200 ||  || — || October 17, 2006 || Kitt Peak || Spacewatch || — || align=right | 3.6 km || 
|}

428201–428300 

|-bgcolor=#fefefe
| 428201 ||  || — || October 21, 2006 || Palomar || NEAT || MAS || align=right data-sort-value="0.82" | 820 m || 
|-id=202 bgcolor=#fefefe
| 428202 ||  || — || September 26, 2006 || Mount Lemmon || Mount Lemmon Survey || — || align=right data-sort-value="0.61" | 610 m || 
|-id=203 bgcolor=#fefefe
| 428203 ||  || — || October 27, 2006 || Mount Lemmon || Mount Lemmon Survey || MAS || align=right data-sort-value="0.54" | 540 m || 
|-id=204 bgcolor=#fefefe
| 428204 ||  || — || October 4, 2006 || Mount Lemmon || Mount Lemmon Survey || — || align=right data-sort-value="0.67" | 670 m || 
|-id=205 bgcolor=#fefefe
| 428205 ||  || — || September 28, 2006 || Mount Lemmon || Mount Lemmon Survey || NYS || align=right data-sort-value="0.56" | 560 m || 
|-id=206 bgcolor=#fefefe
| 428206 ||  || — || October 28, 2006 || Mount Lemmon || Mount Lemmon Survey || MAS || align=right data-sort-value="0.68" | 680 m || 
|-id=207 bgcolor=#fefefe
| 428207 ||  || — || September 25, 2006 || Mount Lemmon || Mount Lemmon Survey || — || align=right data-sort-value="0.67" | 670 m || 
|-id=208 bgcolor=#fefefe
| 428208 ||  || — || October 16, 2006 || Apache Point || A. C. Becker || MAS || align=right data-sort-value="0.61" | 610 m || 
|-id=209 bgcolor=#FFC2E0
| 428209 ||  || — || November 1, 2006 || Catalina || CSS || APOPHAcritical || align=right data-sort-value="0.36" | 360 m || 
|-id=210 bgcolor=#fefefe
| 428210 ||  || — || September 27, 2006 || Mount Lemmon || Mount Lemmon Survey || NYS || align=right data-sort-value="0.55" | 550 m || 
|-id=211 bgcolor=#fefefe
| 428211 ||  || — || October 21, 2006 || Kitt Peak || Spacewatch || — || align=right data-sort-value="0.73" | 730 m || 
|-id=212 bgcolor=#fefefe
| 428212 ||  || — || November 9, 2006 || Kitt Peak || Spacewatch || — || align=right data-sort-value="0.68" | 680 m || 
|-id=213 bgcolor=#fefefe
| 428213 ||  || — || November 9, 2006 || Kitt Peak || Spacewatch || — || align=right data-sort-value="0.56" | 560 m || 
|-id=214 bgcolor=#fefefe
| 428214 ||  || — || November 11, 2006 || Mount Lemmon || Mount Lemmon Survey || — || align=right data-sort-value="0.60" | 600 m || 
|-id=215 bgcolor=#fefefe
| 428215 ||  || — || November 11, 2006 || Catalina || CSS || — || align=right data-sort-value="0.93" | 930 m || 
|-id=216 bgcolor=#d6d6d6
| 428216 ||  || — || September 27, 2006 || Mount Lemmon || Mount Lemmon Survey || (260)7:4 || align=right | 3.1 km || 
|-id=217 bgcolor=#fefefe
| 428217 ||  || — || October 21, 2006 || Mount Lemmon || Mount Lemmon Survey || — || align=right data-sort-value="0.93" | 930 m || 
|-id=218 bgcolor=#fefefe
| 428218 ||  || — || October 4, 2006 || Mount Lemmon || Mount Lemmon Survey || — || align=right data-sort-value="0.85" | 850 m || 
|-id=219 bgcolor=#fefefe
| 428219 ||  || — || October 20, 2006 || Kitt Peak || Spacewatch || MAS || align=right data-sort-value="0.63" | 630 m || 
|-id=220 bgcolor=#fefefe
| 428220 ||  || — || October 21, 2006 || Kitt Peak || Spacewatch || — || align=right data-sort-value="0.75" | 750 m || 
|-id=221 bgcolor=#fefefe
| 428221 ||  || — || November 14, 2006 || Kitt Peak || Spacewatch || — || align=right data-sort-value="0.76" | 760 m || 
|-id=222 bgcolor=#fefefe
| 428222 ||  || — || November 15, 2006 || Kitt Peak || Spacewatch || — || align=right data-sort-value="0.68" | 680 m || 
|-id=223 bgcolor=#FFC2E0
| 428223 ||  || — || November 17, 2006 || Catalina || CSS || APO +1km || align=right | 2.1 km || 
|-id=224 bgcolor=#fefefe
| 428224 ||  || — || November 16, 2006 || Kitt Peak || Spacewatch || — || align=right | 1.1 km || 
|-id=225 bgcolor=#fefefe
| 428225 ||  || — || November 16, 2006 || Kitt Peak || Spacewatch || — || align=right data-sort-value="0.72" | 720 m || 
|-id=226 bgcolor=#fefefe
| 428226 ||  || — || November 16, 2006 || Kitt Peak || Spacewatch || — || align=right data-sort-value="0.58" | 580 m || 
|-id=227 bgcolor=#fefefe
| 428227 ||  || — || November 19, 2006 || Kitt Peak || Spacewatch || — || align=right data-sort-value="0.80" | 800 m || 
|-id=228 bgcolor=#fefefe
| 428228 ||  || — || November 15, 2006 || Catalina || CSS || — || align=right data-sort-value="0.63" | 630 m || 
|-id=229 bgcolor=#fefefe
| 428229 ||  || — || November 15, 2006 || Catalina || CSS || — || align=right data-sort-value="0.67" | 670 m || 
|-id=230 bgcolor=#fefefe
| 428230 ||  || — || November 21, 2006 || Mount Lemmon || Mount Lemmon Survey || NYS || align=right data-sort-value="0.67" | 670 m || 
|-id=231 bgcolor=#fefefe
| 428231 ||  || — || November 22, 2006 || Kitt Peak || Spacewatch || — || align=right data-sort-value="0.78" | 780 m || 
|-id=232 bgcolor=#fefefe
| 428232 ||  || — || October 20, 2006 || Mount Lemmon || Mount Lemmon Survey || — || align=right data-sort-value="0.88" | 880 m || 
|-id=233 bgcolor=#fefefe
| 428233 ||  || — || November 11, 2006 || Kitt Peak || Spacewatch || — || align=right data-sort-value="0.61" | 610 m || 
|-id=234 bgcolor=#fefefe
| 428234 ||  || — || November 24, 2006 || Kitt Peak || Spacewatch || — || align=right data-sort-value="0.87" | 870 m || 
|-id=235 bgcolor=#fefefe
| 428235 ||  || — || October 21, 2006 || Kitt Peak || Spacewatch || — || align=right data-sort-value="0.54" | 540 m || 
|-id=236 bgcolor=#fefefe
| 428236 ||  || — || December 10, 2006 || Kitt Peak || Spacewatch || MAS || align=right data-sort-value="0.55" | 550 m || 
|-id=237 bgcolor=#fefefe
| 428237 ||  || — || November 10, 2006 || Kitt Peak || Spacewatch || — || align=right data-sort-value="0.70" | 700 m || 
|-id=238 bgcolor=#fefefe
| 428238 ||  || — || November 17, 2006 || Mount Lemmon || Mount Lemmon Survey || NYS || align=right data-sort-value="0.69" | 690 m || 
|-id=239 bgcolor=#fefefe
| 428239 ||  || — || November 22, 2006 || Mount Lemmon || Mount Lemmon Survey || NYS || align=right data-sort-value="0.59" | 590 m || 
|-id=240 bgcolor=#fefefe
| 428240 ||  || — || December 15, 2006 || Kitt Peak || Spacewatch || MAS || align=right data-sort-value="0.74" | 740 m || 
|-id=241 bgcolor=#fefefe
| 428241 ||  || — || December 13, 2006 || Mount Lemmon || Mount Lemmon Survey || MAS || align=right data-sort-value="0.63" | 630 m || 
|-id=242 bgcolor=#fefefe
| 428242 ||  || — || November 16, 2006 || Kitt Peak || Spacewatch || NYS || align=right data-sort-value="0.61" | 610 m || 
|-id=243 bgcolor=#fefefe
| 428243 ||  || — || December 24, 2006 || Kitt Peak || Spacewatch || — || align=right data-sort-value="0.65" | 650 m || 
|-id=244 bgcolor=#fefefe
| 428244 ||  || — || November 12, 2006 || Mount Lemmon || Mount Lemmon Survey || NYS || align=right data-sort-value="0.55" | 550 m || 
|-id=245 bgcolor=#E9E9E9
| 428245 ||  || — || December 1, 2006 || Mount Lemmon || Mount Lemmon Survey || — || align=right data-sort-value="0.92" | 920 m || 
|-id=246 bgcolor=#fefefe
| 428246 ||  || — || December 21, 2006 || Kitt Peak || Spacewatch || — || align=right data-sort-value="0.65" | 650 m || 
|-id=247 bgcolor=#fefefe
| 428247 ||  || — || January 8, 2007 || Catalina || CSS || H || align=right data-sort-value="0.94" | 940 m || 
|-id=248 bgcolor=#fefefe
| 428248 ||  || — || November 18, 2006 || Mount Lemmon || Mount Lemmon Survey || NYS || align=right data-sort-value="0.71" | 710 m || 
|-id=249 bgcolor=#E9E9E9
| 428249 ||  || — || January 16, 2007 || Catalina || CSS || — || align=right | 1.0 km || 
|-id=250 bgcolor=#fefefe
| 428250 ||  || — || January 17, 2007 || Kitt Peak || Spacewatch || H || align=right data-sort-value="0.72" | 720 m || 
|-id=251 bgcolor=#d6d6d6
| 428251 ||  || — || January 24, 2007 || Socorro || LINEAR || 7:4 || align=right | 4.1 km || 
|-id=252 bgcolor=#fefefe
| 428252 ||  || — || November 27, 2006 || Mount Lemmon || Mount Lemmon Survey || — || align=right data-sort-value="0.69" | 690 m || 
|-id=253 bgcolor=#fefefe
| 428253 ||  || — || January 25, 2007 || Catalina || CSS || — || align=right data-sort-value="0.96" | 960 m || 
|-id=254 bgcolor=#fefefe
| 428254 ||  || — || January 17, 2007 || Kitt Peak || Spacewatch || H || align=right data-sort-value="0.72" | 720 m || 
|-id=255 bgcolor=#fefefe
| 428255 ||  || — || December 21, 2006 || Kitt Peak || Spacewatch || — || align=right data-sort-value="0.77" | 770 m || 
|-id=256 bgcolor=#E9E9E9
| 428256 ||  || — || January 27, 2007 || Kitt Peak || Spacewatch || BRG || align=right | 1.7 km || 
|-id=257 bgcolor=#fefefe
| 428257 ||  || — || January 25, 2007 || Catalina || CSS || H || align=right data-sort-value="0.67" | 670 m || 
|-id=258 bgcolor=#fefefe
| 428258 ||  || — || January 17, 2007 || Kitt Peak || Spacewatch || — || align=right data-sort-value="0.73" | 730 m || 
|-id=259 bgcolor=#E9E9E9
| 428259 Laphil ||  ||  || February 5, 2007 || Lulin Observatory || Q.-z. Ye, H.-C. Lin || — || align=right data-sort-value="0.99" | 990 m || 
|-id=260 bgcolor=#fefefe
| 428260 ||  || — || February 8, 2007 || Mount Lemmon || Mount Lemmon Survey || — || align=right data-sort-value="0.87" | 870 m || 
|-id=261 bgcolor=#E9E9E9
| 428261 ||  || — || January 17, 2007 || Catalina || CSS || — || align=right | 1.6 km || 
|-id=262 bgcolor=#E9E9E9
| 428262 ||  || — || February 10, 2007 || Catalina || CSS || — || align=right | 1.8 km || 
|-id=263 bgcolor=#fefefe
| 428263 ||  || — || February 8, 2007 || Kitt Peak || Spacewatch || H || align=right data-sort-value="0.75" | 750 m || 
|-id=264 bgcolor=#E9E9E9
| 428264 ||  || — || February 10, 2007 || Mount Lemmon || Mount Lemmon Survey || EUN || align=right | 1.2 km || 
|-id=265 bgcolor=#fefefe
| 428265 ||  || — || February 10, 2007 || Mount Lemmon || Mount Lemmon Survey || — || align=right data-sort-value="0.79" | 790 m || 
|-id=266 bgcolor=#E9E9E9
| 428266 ||  || — || February 17, 2007 || Kitt Peak || Spacewatch || — || align=right data-sort-value="0.97" | 970 m || 
|-id=267 bgcolor=#E9E9E9
| 428267 ||  || — || February 17, 2007 || Kitt Peak || Spacewatch || — || align=right data-sort-value="0.98" | 980 m || 
|-id=268 bgcolor=#fefefe
| 428268 ||  || — || February 17, 2007 || Kitt Peak || Spacewatch || H || align=right data-sort-value="0.78" | 780 m || 
|-id=269 bgcolor=#E9E9E9
| 428269 ||  || — || February 21, 2007 || Mount Lemmon || Mount Lemmon Survey || — || align=right | 1.3 km || 
|-id=270 bgcolor=#E9E9E9
| 428270 ||  || — || February 21, 2007 || Kitt Peak || Spacewatch || — || align=right data-sort-value="0.83" | 830 m || 
|-id=271 bgcolor=#fefefe
| 428271 ||  || — || February 19, 2007 || Catalina || CSS || H || align=right | 1.0 km || 
|-id=272 bgcolor=#fefefe
| 428272 ||  || — || February 8, 2007 || Kitt Peak || Spacewatch || — || align=right data-sort-value="0.77" | 770 m || 
|-id=273 bgcolor=#E9E9E9
| 428273 ||  || — || February 21, 2007 || Kitt Peak || Spacewatch || — || align=right data-sort-value="0.64" | 640 m || 
|-id=274 bgcolor=#E9E9E9
| 428274 ||  || — || February 23, 2007 || Mount Lemmon || Mount Lemmon Survey || — || align=right data-sort-value="0.89" | 890 m || 
|-id=275 bgcolor=#E9E9E9
| 428275 ||  || — || February 25, 2007 || Mount Lemmon || Mount Lemmon Survey || — || align=right | 1.0 km || 
|-id=276 bgcolor=#E9E9E9
| 428276 ||  || — || March 10, 2007 || Mount Lemmon || Mount Lemmon Survey || — || align=right | 1.9 km || 
|-id=277 bgcolor=#E9E9E9
| 428277 ||  || — || February 21, 2007 || Mount Lemmon || Mount Lemmon Survey || MAR || align=right data-sort-value="0.90" | 900 m || 
|-id=278 bgcolor=#E9E9E9
| 428278 ||  || — || February 23, 2007 || Kitt Peak || Spacewatch || — || align=right | 1.00 km || 
|-id=279 bgcolor=#E9E9E9
| 428279 ||  || — || March 9, 2007 || Mount Lemmon || Mount Lemmon Survey || — || align=right data-sort-value="0.98" | 980 m || 
|-id=280 bgcolor=#E9E9E9
| 428280 ||  || — || March 10, 2007 || Kitt Peak || Spacewatch || — || align=right data-sort-value="0.88" | 880 m || 
|-id=281 bgcolor=#E9E9E9
| 428281 ||  || — || March 12, 2007 || Catalina || CSS || — || align=right | 1.2 km || 
|-id=282 bgcolor=#E9E9E9
| 428282 ||  || — || March 24, 2003 || Kitt Peak || Spacewatch || (5) || align=right data-sort-value="0.84" | 840 m || 
|-id=283 bgcolor=#E9E9E9
| 428283 ||  || — || March 10, 2007 || Mount Lemmon || Mount Lemmon Survey || — || align=right | 1.1 km || 
|-id=284 bgcolor=#E9E9E9
| 428284 ||  || — || March 27, 2003 || Kitt Peak || Spacewatch || — || align=right data-sort-value="0.76" | 760 m || 
|-id=285 bgcolor=#E9E9E9
| 428285 ||  || — || March 11, 2007 || Kitt Peak || Spacewatch || — || align=right | 1.2 km || 
|-id=286 bgcolor=#E9E9E9
| 428286 ||  || — || March 11, 2007 || Mount Lemmon || Mount Lemmon Survey || — || align=right data-sort-value="0.80" | 800 m || 
|-id=287 bgcolor=#E9E9E9
| 428287 ||  || — || March 13, 2007 || Mount Lemmon || Mount Lemmon Survey || KON || align=right | 1.9 km || 
|-id=288 bgcolor=#fefefe
| 428288 ||  || — || February 13, 2007 || Mount Lemmon || Mount Lemmon Survey || — || align=right | 1.3 km || 
|-id=289 bgcolor=#E9E9E9
| 428289 ||  || — || January 27, 2007 || Kitt Peak || Spacewatch || — || align=right data-sort-value="0.80" | 800 m || 
|-id=290 bgcolor=#E9E9E9
| 428290 ||  || — || March 9, 2007 || Mount Lemmon || Mount Lemmon Survey || — || align=right data-sort-value="0.77" | 770 m || 
|-id=291 bgcolor=#E9E9E9
| 428291 ||  || — || March 9, 2007 || Mount Lemmon || Mount Lemmon Survey || — || align=right data-sort-value="0.75" | 750 m || 
|-id=292 bgcolor=#E9E9E9
| 428292 ||  || — || March 11, 2007 || Kitt Peak || Spacewatch || EUN || align=right | 1.3 km || 
|-id=293 bgcolor=#E9E9E9
| 428293 ||  || — || March 12, 2007 || Kitt Peak || Spacewatch || — || align=right | 1.6 km || 
|-id=294 bgcolor=#E9E9E9
| 428294 ||  || — || March 12, 2007 || Mount Lemmon || Mount Lemmon Survey || — || align=right | 1.3 km || 
|-id=295 bgcolor=#E9E9E9
| 428295 ||  || — || March 12, 2007 || Mount Lemmon || Mount Lemmon Survey || — || align=right | 1.3 km || 
|-id=296 bgcolor=#E9E9E9
| 428296 ||  || — || March 14, 2007 || Kitt Peak || Spacewatch || — || align=right | 1.2 km || 
|-id=297 bgcolor=#E9E9E9
| 428297 ||  || — || February 26, 2007 || Mount Lemmon || Mount Lemmon Survey || — || align=right | 1.3 km || 
|-id=298 bgcolor=#E9E9E9
| 428298 ||  || — || December 4, 2005 || Kitt Peak || Spacewatch || EUN || align=right | 1.4 km || 
|-id=299 bgcolor=#fefefe
| 428299 ||  || — || March 10, 2007 || Kitt Peak || Spacewatch || H || align=right data-sort-value="0.98" | 980 m || 
|-id=300 bgcolor=#E9E9E9
| 428300 ||  || — || March 12, 2007 || Kitt Peak || Spacewatch || — || align=right data-sort-value="0.72" | 720 m || 
|}

428301–428400 

|-bgcolor=#E9E9E9
| 428301 ||  || — || March 12, 2007 || Catalina || CSS || — || align=right | 1.6 km || 
|-id=302 bgcolor=#E9E9E9
| 428302 ||  || — || March 9, 2007 || Mount Lemmon || Mount Lemmon Survey || — || align=right data-sort-value="0.71" | 710 m || 
|-id=303 bgcolor=#E9E9E9
| 428303 ||  || — || March 15, 2007 || Catalina || CSS || EUN || align=right | 1.6 km || 
|-id=304 bgcolor=#E9E9E9
| 428304 ||  || — || March 16, 2007 || Mount Lemmon || Mount Lemmon Survey || EUN || align=right | 1.3 km || 
|-id=305 bgcolor=#E9E9E9
| 428305 ||  || — || March 13, 2007 || Catalina || CSS || — || align=right | 2.0 km || 
|-id=306 bgcolor=#E9E9E9
| 428306 ||  || — || March 10, 2007 || Mount Lemmon || Mount Lemmon Survey || — || align=right | 1.8 km || 
|-id=307 bgcolor=#fefefe
| 428307 ||  || — || March 20, 2007 || Socorro || LINEAR || H || align=right data-sort-value="0.93" | 930 m || 
|-id=308 bgcolor=#E9E9E9
| 428308 ||  || — || March 20, 2007 || Kitt Peak || Spacewatch || — || align=right data-sort-value="0.89" | 890 m || 
|-id=309 bgcolor=#fefefe
| 428309 ||  || — || March 17, 2007 || Anderson Mesa || LONEOS || H || align=right data-sort-value="0.83" | 830 m || 
|-id=310 bgcolor=#E9E9E9
| 428310 ||  || — || March 25, 2007 || Mount Lemmon || Mount Lemmon Survey || — || align=right | 1.6 km || 
|-id=311 bgcolor=#E9E9E9
| 428311 ||  || — || March 20, 2007 || Catalina || CSS || — || align=right | 2.0 km || 
|-id=312 bgcolor=#E9E9E9
| 428312 ||  || — || April 7, 2007 || Mount Lemmon || Mount Lemmon Survey || — || align=right | 1.2 km || 
|-id=313 bgcolor=#E9E9E9
| 428313 ||  || — || April 7, 2007 || Mount Lemmon || Mount Lemmon Survey || — || align=right | 1.2 km || 
|-id=314 bgcolor=#E9E9E9
| 428314 ||  || — || April 11, 2007 || Kitt Peak || Spacewatch || — || align=right | 1.7 km || 
|-id=315 bgcolor=#E9E9E9
| 428315 ||  || — || April 11, 2007 || Mount Lemmon || Mount Lemmon Survey || — || align=right | 1.3 km || 
|-id=316 bgcolor=#E9E9E9
| 428316 ||  || — || April 11, 2007 || Mount Lemmon || Mount Lemmon Survey || — || align=right | 2.5 km || 
|-id=317 bgcolor=#E9E9E9
| 428317 ||  || — || April 14, 2007 || Kitt Peak || Spacewatch || — || align=right data-sort-value="0.92" | 920 m || 
|-id=318 bgcolor=#E9E9E9
| 428318 ||  || — || March 14, 2007 || Mount Lemmon || Mount Lemmon Survey || — || align=right | 1.5 km || 
|-id=319 bgcolor=#E9E9E9
| 428319 ||  || — || April 15, 2007 || Kitt Peak || Spacewatch || (5) || align=right data-sort-value="0.68" | 680 m || 
|-id=320 bgcolor=#E9E9E9
| 428320 ||  || — || April 15, 2007 || Mount Lemmon || Mount Lemmon Survey || MAR || align=right data-sort-value="0.88" | 880 m || 
|-id=321 bgcolor=#E9E9E9
| 428321 ||  || — || April 15, 2007 || Catalina || CSS || — || align=right | 1.6 km || 
|-id=322 bgcolor=#E9E9E9
| 428322 ||  || — || February 25, 2007 || Mount Lemmon || Mount Lemmon Survey || — || align=right | 1.5 km || 
|-id=323 bgcolor=#E9E9E9
| 428323 ||  || — || April 18, 2007 || Kitt Peak || Spacewatch || — || align=right | 1.4 km || 
|-id=324 bgcolor=#E9E9E9
| 428324 ||  || — || April 19, 2007 || Mount Lemmon || Mount Lemmon Survey || — || align=right data-sort-value="0.95" | 950 m || 
|-id=325 bgcolor=#E9E9E9
| 428325 ||  || — || April 18, 2007 || Kitt Peak || Spacewatch || — || align=right | 1.3 km || 
|-id=326 bgcolor=#E9E9E9
| 428326 ||  || — || April 20, 2007 || Kitt Peak || Spacewatch || — || align=right | 1.2 km || 
|-id=327 bgcolor=#E9E9E9
| 428327 ||  || — || April 20, 2007 || Kitt Peak || Spacewatch || — || align=right | 1.4 km || 
|-id=328 bgcolor=#E9E9E9
| 428328 ||  || — || April 22, 2007 || Catalina || CSS || — || align=right | 1.8 km || 
|-id=329 bgcolor=#E9E9E9
| 428329 ||  || — || April 23, 2007 || Mount Lemmon || Mount Lemmon Survey || — || align=right | 1.4 km || 
|-id=330 bgcolor=#E9E9E9
| 428330 ||  || — || April 14, 2007 || Kitt Peak || Spacewatch || — || align=right data-sort-value="0.89" | 890 m || 
|-id=331 bgcolor=#E9E9E9
| 428331 ||  || — || March 15, 2007 || Mount Lemmon || Mount Lemmon Survey || — || align=right | 1.7 km || 
|-id=332 bgcolor=#E9E9E9
| 428332 ||  || — || February 16, 2007 || Mount Lemmon || Mount Lemmon Survey || — || align=right | 1.0 km || 
|-id=333 bgcolor=#E9E9E9
| 428333 ||  || — || April 22, 2007 || Mount Lemmon || Mount Lemmon Survey || MAR || align=right data-sort-value="0.98" | 980 m || 
|-id=334 bgcolor=#E9E9E9
| 428334 ||  || — || April 24, 2007 || Kitt Peak || Spacewatch || — || align=right | 2.5 km || 
|-id=335 bgcolor=#E9E9E9
| 428335 ||  || — || April 24, 2007 || Kitt Peak || Spacewatch || — || align=right | 1.4 km || 
|-id=336 bgcolor=#E9E9E9
| 428336 ||  || — || April 23, 2007 || Catalina || CSS || ADE || align=right | 2.4 km || 
|-id=337 bgcolor=#E9E9E9
| 428337 ||  || — || April 16, 2007 || Catalina || CSS || — || align=right | 2.2 km || 
|-id=338 bgcolor=#E9E9E9
| 428338 ||  || — || April 24, 2007 || Mount Lemmon || Mount Lemmon Survey || MAR || align=right | 1.00 km || 
|-id=339 bgcolor=#E9E9E9
| 428339 ||  || — || May 7, 2007 || Purple Mountain || PMO NEO || — || align=right | 3.4 km || 
|-id=340 bgcolor=#E9E9E9
| 428340 ||  || — || May 24, 2007 || Kitt Peak || Spacewatch || — || align=right | 1.3 km || 
|-id=341 bgcolor=#E9E9E9
| 428341 ||  || — || May 11, 2007 || Mount Lemmon || Mount Lemmon Survey || — || align=right | 2.3 km || 
|-id=342 bgcolor=#E9E9E9
| 428342 ||  || — || May 17, 2007 || Catalina || CSS || — || align=right | 1.8 km || 
|-id=343 bgcolor=#E9E9E9
| 428343 ||  || — || May 12, 2007 || Mount Lemmon || Mount Lemmon Survey || — || align=right | 1.4 km || 
|-id=344 bgcolor=#E9E9E9
| 428344 ||  || — || June 7, 2007 || Kitt Peak || Spacewatch || — || align=right | 1.5 km || 
|-id=345 bgcolor=#E9E9E9
| 428345 ||  || — || March 15, 2007 || Mount Lemmon || Mount Lemmon Survey || — || align=right | 2.8 km || 
|-id=346 bgcolor=#E9E9E9
| 428346 ||  || — || June 14, 2007 || Kitt Peak || Spacewatch || EUN || align=right | 1.3 km || 
|-id=347 bgcolor=#C2FFFF
| 428347 ||  || — || June 11, 2007 || Mauna Kea || D. D. Balam || L4 || align=right | 7.4 km || 
|-id=348 bgcolor=#E9E9E9
| 428348 ||  || — || June 17, 2007 || Kitt Peak || Spacewatch || — || align=right | 3.1 km || 
|-id=349 bgcolor=#d6d6d6
| 428349 ||  || — || June 17, 2007 || Kitt Peak || Spacewatch || — || align=right | 2.6 km || 
|-id=350 bgcolor=#E9E9E9
| 428350 ||  || — || March 15, 2007 || Mount Lemmon || Mount Lemmon Survey || — || align=right | 1.5 km || 
|-id=351 bgcolor=#E9E9E9
| 428351 ||  || — || July 22, 2007 || Lulin Observatory || LUSS || — || align=right | 1.7 km || 
|-id=352 bgcolor=#d6d6d6
| 428352 ||  || — || May 13, 2007 || Catalina || CSS || — || align=right | 8.1 km || 
|-id=353 bgcolor=#d6d6d6
| 428353 ||  || — || August 8, 2007 || Socorro || LINEAR || — || align=right | 4.6 km || 
|-id=354 bgcolor=#d6d6d6
| 428354 ||  || — || August 10, 2007 || Kitt Peak || Spacewatch || KOR || align=right | 1.3 km || 
|-id=355 bgcolor=#d6d6d6
| 428355 ||  || — || August 24, 2007 || Kitt Peak || Spacewatch || — || align=right | 2.9 km || 
|-id=356 bgcolor=#d6d6d6
| 428356 ||  || — || September 3, 2007 || Catalina || CSS || — || align=right | 3.9 km || 
|-id=357 bgcolor=#d6d6d6
| 428357 ||  || — || September 5, 2007 || Anderson Mesa || LONEOS || — || align=right | 3.2 km || 
|-id=358 bgcolor=#d6d6d6
| 428358 ||  || — || September 9, 2007 || Mount Lemmon || Mount Lemmon Survey || — || align=right | 2.7 km || 
|-id=359 bgcolor=#d6d6d6
| 428359 ||  || — || September 9, 2007 || Mount Lemmon || Mount Lemmon Survey || Tj (2.99) || align=right | 3.7 km || 
|-id=360 bgcolor=#d6d6d6
| 428360 ||  || — || September 9, 2007 || Anderson Mesa || LONEOS || — || align=right | 3.5 km || 
|-id=361 bgcolor=#d6d6d6
| 428361 ||  || — || September 10, 2007 || Kitt Peak || Spacewatch || — || align=right | 3.2 km || 
|-id=362 bgcolor=#d6d6d6
| 428362 ||  || — || September 10, 2007 || Mount Lemmon || Mount Lemmon Survey || — || align=right | 2.1 km || 
|-id=363 bgcolor=#fefefe
| 428363 ||  || — || September 10, 2007 || Kitt Peak || Spacewatch || — || align=right data-sort-value="0.51" | 510 m || 
|-id=364 bgcolor=#d6d6d6
| 428364 ||  || — || September 10, 2007 || Kitt Peak || Spacewatch || — || align=right | 2.5 km || 
|-id=365 bgcolor=#d6d6d6
| 428365 ||  || — || September 11, 2007 || Catalina || CSS || THB || align=right | 3.2 km || 
|-id=366 bgcolor=#d6d6d6
| 428366 ||  || — || September 11, 2007 || Kitt Peak || Spacewatch || — || align=right | 3.1 km || 
|-id=367 bgcolor=#d6d6d6
| 428367 ||  || — || September 13, 2007 || Altschwendt || W. Ries || — || align=right | 2.7 km || 
|-id=368 bgcolor=#d6d6d6
| 428368 ||  || — || September 14, 2007 || Mount Lemmon || Mount Lemmon Survey || — || align=right | 2.6 km || 
|-id=369 bgcolor=#d6d6d6
| 428369 ||  || — || September 12, 2007 || Mount Lemmon || Mount Lemmon Survey || — || align=right | 3.5 km || 
|-id=370 bgcolor=#d6d6d6
| 428370 ||  || — || September 12, 2007 || Kitt Peak || Spacewatch || HYG || align=right | 2.5 km || 
|-id=371 bgcolor=#d6d6d6
| 428371 ||  || — || September 13, 2007 || Kitt Peak || Spacewatch || — || align=right | 3.3 km || 
|-id=372 bgcolor=#d6d6d6
| 428372 ||  || — || September 10, 2007 || Kitt Peak || Spacewatch || — || align=right | 2.2 km || 
|-id=373 bgcolor=#d6d6d6
| 428373 ||  || — || September 11, 2007 || Purple Mountain || PMO NEO || — || align=right | 3.2 km || 
|-id=374 bgcolor=#fefefe
| 428374 ||  || — || September 12, 2007 || Kitt Peak || Spacewatch || — || align=right data-sort-value="0.68" | 680 m || 
|-id=375 bgcolor=#d6d6d6
| 428375 ||  || — || September 12, 2007 || Catalina || CSS || — || align=right | 3.9 km || 
|-id=376 bgcolor=#d6d6d6
| 428376 ||  || — || September 13, 2007 || Catalina || CSS || Tj (2.99) || align=right | 3.5 km || 
|-id=377 bgcolor=#fefefe
| 428377 ||  || — || September 13, 2007 || Mount Lemmon || Mount Lemmon Survey || — || align=right data-sort-value="0.58" | 580 m || 
|-id=378 bgcolor=#fefefe
| 428378 ||  || — || September 14, 2007 || Kitt Peak || Spacewatch || — || align=right data-sort-value="0.78" | 780 m || 
|-id=379 bgcolor=#d6d6d6
| 428379 ||  || — || September 14, 2007 || Kitt Peak || Spacewatch || — || align=right | 3.0 km || 
|-id=380 bgcolor=#d6d6d6
| 428380 ||  || — || September 13, 2007 || Catalina || CSS || — || align=right | 3.5 km || 
|-id=381 bgcolor=#d6d6d6
| 428381 ||  || — || September 9, 2007 || Kitt Peak || Spacewatch || EOS || align=right | 2.1 km || 
|-id=382 bgcolor=#d6d6d6
| 428382 ||  || — || September 13, 2007 || Mount Lemmon || Mount Lemmon Survey || — || align=right | 2.9 km || 
|-id=383 bgcolor=#d6d6d6
| 428383 ||  || — || September 12, 2007 || Mount Lemmon || Mount Lemmon Survey || — || align=right | 4.0 km || 
|-id=384 bgcolor=#d6d6d6
| 428384 ||  || — || September 12, 2007 || Mount Lemmon || Mount Lemmon Survey || THM || align=right | 2.3 km || 
|-id=385 bgcolor=#d6d6d6
| 428385 ||  || — || September 13, 2007 || Kitt Peak || Spacewatch || — || align=right | 1.9 km || 
|-id=386 bgcolor=#d6d6d6
| 428386 ||  || — || September 13, 2007 || Kitt Peak || Spacewatch || — || align=right | 3.0 km || 
|-id=387 bgcolor=#d6d6d6
| 428387 ||  || — || September 14, 2007 || Catalina || CSS || BRA || align=right | 1.8 km || 
|-id=388 bgcolor=#d6d6d6
| 428388 ||  || — || September 13, 2007 || Mount Lemmon || Mount Lemmon Survey || — || align=right | 2.7 km || 
|-id=389 bgcolor=#d6d6d6
| 428389 ||  || — || September 13, 2007 || Anderson Mesa || LONEOS || LIX || align=right | 3.6 km || 
|-id=390 bgcolor=#d6d6d6
| 428390 ||  || — || September 12, 2007 || Mount Lemmon || Mount Lemmon Survey || — || align=right | 3.8 km || 
|-id=391 bgcolor=#d6d6d6
| 428391 ||  || — || September 13, 2007 || Kitt Peak || Spacewatch || — || align=right | 5.1 km || 
|-id=392 bgcolor=#fefefe
| 428392 ||  || — || September 13, 2007 || Socorro || LINEAR || — || align=right data-sort-value="0.65" | 650 m || 
|-id=393 bgcolor=#d6d6d6
| 428393 ||  || — || September 14, 2007 || Mount Lemmon || Mount Lemmon Survey || — || align=right | 3.2 km || 
|-id=394 bgcolor=#d6d6d6
| 428394 ||  || — || September 18, 2007 || Kitt Peak || Spacewatch || EOS || align=right | 1.7 km || 
|-id=395 bgcolor=#d6d6d6
| 428395 ||  || — || September 11, 2007 || Kitt Peak || Spacewatch || KOR || align=right | 1.8 km || 
|-id=396 bgcolor=#d6d6d6
| 428396 ||  || — || September 21, 2007 || Bergisch Gladbach || W. Bickel || — || align=right | 3.8 km || 
|-id=397 bgcolor=#d6d6d6
| 428397 ||  || — || September 12, 2007 || Catalina || CSS || BRA || align=right | 1.7 km || 
|-id=398 bgcolor=#fefefe
| 428398 ||  || — || September 21, 2007 || Kitt Peak || Spacewatch || — || align=right data-sort-value="0.63" | 630 m || 
|-id=399 bgcolor=#d6d6d6
| 428399 ||  || — || September 21, 2007 || XuYi || PMO NEO || EOS || align=right | 2.4 km || 
|-id=400 bgcolor=#d6d6d6
| 428400 ||  || — || January 16, 2004 || Kitt Peak || Spacewatch || — || align=right | 2.7 km || 
|}

428401–428500 

|-bgcolor=#d6d6d6
| 428401 ||  || — || October 8, 2007 || 7300 Observatory || W. K. Y. Yeung || — || align=right | 3.2 km || 
|-id=402 bgcolor=#d6d6d6
| 428402 ||  || — || October 6, 2007 || Kitt Peak || Spacewatch || — || align=right | 2.5 km || 
|-id=403 bgcolor=#d6d6d6
| 428403 ||  || — || October 6, 2007 || Kitt Peak || Spacewatch || — || align=right | 2.4 km || 
|-id=404 bgcolor=#d6d6d6
| 428404 ||  || — || October 4, 2007 || Kitt Peak || Spacewatch || — || align=right | 2.9 km || 
|-id=405 bgcolor=#d6d6d6
| 428405 ||  || — || October 4, 2007 || Kitt Peak || Spacewatch || EOS || align=right | 2.1 km || 
|-id=406 bgcolor=#d6d6d6
| 428406 ||  || — || October 4, 2007 || Kitt Peak || Spacewatch || EOS || align=right | 2.3 km || 
|-id=407 bgcolor=#d6d6d6
| 428407 ||  || — || October 4, 2007 || Kitt Peak || Spacewatch || EOS || align=right | 2.0 km || 
|-id=408 bgcolor=#d6d6d6
| 428408 ||  || — || October 6, 2007 || Kitt Peak || Spacewatch || — || align=right | 2.9 km || 
|-id=409 bgcolor=#d6d6d6
| 428409 ||  || — || October 4, 2007 || Kitt Peak || Spacewatch || — || align=right | 5.4 km || 
|-id=410 bgcolor=#d6d6d6
| 428410 ||  || — || October 7, 2007 || Catalina || CSS || — || align=right | 3.6 km || 
|-id=411 bgcolor=#d6d6d6
| 428411 ||  || — || October 8, 2007 || Mount Lemmon || Mount Lemmon Survey || — || align=right | 2.4 km || 
|-id=412 bgcolor=#d6d6d6
| 428412 ||  || — || October 8, 2007 || Mount Lemmon || Mount Lemmon Survey || — || align=right | 2.4 km || 
|-id=413 bgcolor=#fefefe
| 428413 ||  || — || October 9, 2007 || Anderson Mesa || LONEOS || — || align=right data-sort-value="0.57" | 570 m || 
|-id=414 bgcolor=#d6d6d6
| 428414 ||  || — || October 9, 2007 || Mount Lemmon || Mount Lemmon Survey || — || align=right | 3.0 km || 
|-id=415 bgcolor=#d6d6d6
| 428415 ||  || — || October 6, 2007 || Kitt Peak || Spacewatch || EOS || align=right | 1.8 km || 
|-id=416 bgcolor=#d6d6d6
| 428416 ||  || — || October 6, 2007 || Kitt Peak || Spacewatch || — || align=right | 3.2 km || 
|-id=417 bgcolor=#fefefe
| 428417 ||  || — || September 8, 2007 || Mount Lemmon || Mount Lemmon Survey || — || align=right data-sort-value="0.73" | 730 m || 
|-id=418 bgcolor=#d6d6d6
| 428418 ||  || — || October 9, 2007 || Mount Lemmon || Mount Lemmon Survey || EOS || align=right | 2.3 km || 
|-id=419 bgcolor=#d6d6d6
| 428419 ||  || — || October 9, 2007 || Socorro || LINEAR || — || align=right | 3.4 km || 
|-id=420 bgcolor=#d6d6d6
| 428420 ||  || — || October 4, 2007 || Kitt Peak || Spacewatch || EOS || align=right | 2.0 km || 
|-id=421 bgcolor=#d6d6d6
| 428421 ||  || — || October 6, 2007 || Kitt Peak || Spacewatch || — || align=right | 3.2 km || 
|-id=422 bgcolor=#d6d6d6
| 428422 ||  || — || September 15, 2007 || Kitt Peak || Spacewatch || — || align=right | 2.3 km || 
|-id=423 bgcolor=#d6d6d6
| 428423 ||  || — || October 5, 2007 || Kitt Peak || Spacewatch || — || align=right | 3.1 km || 
|-id=424 bgcolor=#d6d6d6
| 428424 ||  || — || October 8, 2007 || Kitt Peak || Spacewatch || — || align=right | 3.0 km || 
|-id=425 bgcolor=#d6d6d6
| 428425 ||  || — || October 8, 2007 || Kitt Peak || Spacewatch || — || align=right | 2.7 km || 
|-id=426 bgcolor=#d6d6d6
| 428426 ||  || — || October 8, 2007 || Kitt Peak || Spacewatch || — || align=right | 2.6 km || 
|-id=427 bgcolor=#d6d6d6
| 428427 ||  || — || October 8, 2007 || Mount Lemmon || Mount Lemmon Survey || — || align=right | 2.8 km || 
|-id=428 bgcolor=#fefefe
| 428428 ||  || — || September 12, 2007 || Mount Lemmon || Mount Lemmon Survey || — || align=right data-sort-value="0.84" | 840 m || 
|-id=429 bgcolor=#d6d6d6
| 428429 ||  || — || September 10, 2007 || Catalina || CSS || — || align=right | 3.2 km || 
|-id=430 bgcolor=#d6d6d6
| 428430 ||  || — || October 7, 2007 || Kitt Peak || Spacewatch || — || align=right | 3.7 km || 
|-id=431 bgcolor=#d6d6d6
| 428431 ||  || — || October 8, 2007 || Kitt Peak || Spacewatch || LIX || align=right | 4.5 km || 
|-id=432 bgcolor=#d6d6d6
| 428432 ||  || — || October 8, 2007 || Mount Lemmon || Mount Lemmon Survey || (159) || align=right | 2.4 km || 
|-id=433 bgcolor=#d6d6d6
| 428433 ||  || — || October 8, 2007 || Kitt Peak || Spacewatch || — || align=right | 2.8 km || 
|-id=434 bgcolor=#d6d6d6
| 428434 ||  || — || October 11, 2007 || Mount Lemmon || Mount Lemmon Survey || EOS || align=right | 2.2 km || 
|-id=435 bgcolor=#d6d6d6
| 428435 ||  || — || October 8, 2007 || Mount Lemmon || Mount Lemmon Survey || EOS || align=right | 1.8 km || 
|-id=436 bgcolor=#d6d6d6
| 428436 ||  || — || September 25, 2007 || Mount Lemmon || Mount Lemmon Survey || EOS || align=right | 2.0 km || 
|-id=437 bgcolor=#d6d6d6
| 428437 ||  || — || October 10, 2007 || Kitt Peak || Spacewatch || EOS || align=right | 1.9 km || 
|-id=438 bgcolor=#d6d6d6
| 428438 ||  || — || September 14, 2007 || Mount Lemmon || Mount Lemmon Survey || — || align=right | 3.1 km || 
|-id=439 bgcolor=#d6d6d6
| 428439 ||  || — || October 11, 2007 || Catalina || CSS || EOS || align=right | 2.1 km || 
|-id=440 bgcolor=#d6d6d6
| 428440 ||  || — || October 12, 2007 || Kitt Peak || Spacewatch || — || align=right | 2.7 km || 
|-id=441 bgcolor=#d6d6d6
| 428441 ||  || — || September 18, 2007 || Mount Lemmon || Mount Lemmon Survey || — || align=right | 2.9 km || 
|-id=442 bgcolor=#fefefe
| 428442 ||  || — || October 10, 2007 || Lulin || LUSS || — || align=right data-sort-value="0.64" | 640 m || 
|-id=443 bgcolor=#fefefe
| 428443 ||  || — || October 11, 2007 || Kitt Peak || Spacewatch || — || align=right data-sort-value="0.57" | 570 m || 
|-id=444 bgcolor=#d6d6d6
| 428444 ||  || — || October 14, 2007 || Mount Lemmon || Mount Lemmon Survey || — || align=right | 2.8 km || 
|-id=445 bgcolor=#d6d6d6
| 428445 ||  || — || October 5, 2007 || Kitt Peak || Spacewatch || EOS || align=right | 1.9 km || 
|-id=446 bgcolor=#d6d6d6
| 428446 ||  || — || October 14, 2007 || Kitt Peak || Spacewatch || — || align=right | 2.9 km || 
|-id=447 bgcolor=#d6d6d6
| 428447 ||  || — || October 14, 2007 || Mount Lemmon || Mount Lemmon Survey || — || align=right | 3.2 km || 
|-id=448 bgcolor=#d6d6d6
| 428448 ||  || — || October 13, 2007 || Kitt Peak || Spacewatch ||  || align=right | 3.4 km || 
|-id=449 bgcolor=#d6d6d6
| 428449 ||  || — || September 13, 2007 || Kitt Peak || Spacewatch || — || align=right | 2.2 km || 
|-id=450 bgcolor=#d6d6d6
| 428450 ||  || — || October 14, 2007 || Mount Lemmon || Mount Lemmon Survey || — || align=right | 2.7 km || 
|-id=451 bgcolor=#d6d6d6
| 428451 ||  || — || October 15, 2007 || Mount Lemmon || Mount Lemmon Survey || EOS || align=right | 1.7 km || 
|-id=452 bgcolor=#d6d6d6
| 428452 ||  || — || October 11, 2007 || Catalina || CSS || — || align=right | 3.5 km || 
|-id=453 bgcolor=#d6d6d6
| 428453 ||  || — || October 9, 2007 || Kitt Peak || Spacewatch || — || align=right | 2.9 km || 
|-id=454 bgcolor=#d6d6d6
| 428454 ||  || — || October 9, 2007 || Mount Lemmon || Mount Lemmon Survey || — || align=right | 3.6 km || 
|-id=455 bgcolor=#d6d6d6
| 428455 ||  || — || October 8, 2007 || Catalina || CSS || — || align=right | 3.1 km || 
|-id=456 bgcolor=#d6d6d6
| 428456 ||  || — || October 7, 2007 || Catalina || CSS || — || align=right | 2.9 km || 
|-id=457 bgcolor=#d6d6d6
| 428457 ||  || — || March 30, 2004 || Kitt Peak || Spacewatch || — || align=right | 3.6 km || 
|-id=458 bgcolor=#d6d6d6
| 428458 ||  || — || October 15, 2007 || Kitt Peak || Spacewatch || — || align=right | 3.4 km || 
|-id=459 bgcolor=#d6d6d6
| 428459 ||  || — || October 15, 2007 || Mount Lemmon || Mount Lemmon Survey || — || align=right | 3.5 km || 
|-id=460 bgcolor=#d6d6d6
| 428460 ||  || — || October 13, 2007 || Catalina || CSS || — || align=right | 3.7 km || 
|-id=461 bgcolor=#d6d6d6
| 428461 ||  || — || October 11, 2007 || Catalina || CSS || — || align=right | 2.7 km || 
|-id=462 bgcolor=#d6d6d6
| 428462 ||  || — || October 16, 2007 || Kitt Peak || Spacewatch || — || align=right | 3.4 km || 
|-id=463 bgcolor=#d6d6d6
| 428463 ||  || — || October 16, 2007 || Mount Lemmon || Mount Lemmon Survey || EOS || align=right | 2.0 km || 
|-id=464 bgcolor=#d6d6d6
| 428464 ||  || — || September 25, 2007 || Mount Lemmon || Mount Lemmon Survey || HYG || align=right | 2.6 km || 
|-id=465 bgcolor=#d6d6d6
| 428465 ||  || — || October 30, 2007 || Kitt Peak || Spacewatch || — || align=right | 3.4 km || 
|-id=466 bgcolor=#fefefe
| 428466 ||  || — || October 11, 2007 || Kitt Peak || Spacewatch || — || align=right data-sort-value="0.83" | 830 m || 
|-id=467 bgcolor=#d6d6d6
| 428467 ||  || — || October 15, 2007 || Kitt Peak || Spacewatch || — || align=right | 3.0 km || 
|-id=468 bgcolor=#d6d6d6
| 428468 ||  || — || October 30, 2007 || Kitt Peak || Spacewatch || — || align=right | 3.5 km || 
|-id=469 bgcolor=#d6d6d6
| 428469 ||  || — || October 30, 2007 || Mount Lemmon || Mount Lemmon Survey || — || align=right | 3.0 km || 
|-id=470 bgcolor=#fefefe
| 428470 ||  || — || October 30, 2007 || Kitt Peak || Spacewatch || — || align=right data-sort-value="0.65" | 650 m || 
|-id=471 bgcolor=#d6d6d6
| 428471 ||  || — || October 30, 2007 || Kitt Peak || Spacewatch || — || align=right | 3.0 km || 
|-id=472 bgcolor=#d6d6d6
| 428472 ||  || — || September 25, 2007 || Mount Lemmon || Mount Lemmon Survey || — || align=right | 2.6 km || 
|-id=473 bgcolor=#d6d6d6
| 428473 ||  || — || November 2, 2007 || Mount Lemmon || Mount Lemmon Survey || — || align=right | 3.0 km || 
|-id=474 bgcolor=#fefefe
| 428474 ||  || — || October 9, 2007 || Kitt Peak || Spacewatch || — || align=right data-sort-value="0.59" | 590 m || 
|-id=475 bgcolor=#d6d6d6
| 428475 ||  || — || November 1, 2007 || Kitt Peak || Spacewatch || EMA || align=right | 4.5 km || 
|-id=476 bgcolor=#d6d6d6
| 428476 ||  || — || November 1, 2007 || Kitt Peak || Spacewatch || EOS || align=right | 2.0 km || 
|-id=477 bgcolor=#fefefe
| 428477 ||  || — || November 1, 2007 || Kitt Peak || Spacewatch || — || align=right data-sort-value="0.62" | 620 m || 
|-id=478 bgcolor=#fefefe
| 428478 ||  || — || November 1, 2007 || Kitt Peak || Spacewatch || — || align=right data-sort-value="0.61" | 610 m || 
|-id=479 bgcolor=#d6d6d6
| 428479 ||  || — || November 3, 2007 || Kitt Peak || Spacewatch || EOS || align=right | 2.0 km || 
|-id=480 bgcolor=#d6d6d6
| 428480 ||  || — || October 13, 2007 || Kitt Peak || Spacewatch || — || align=right | 3.1 km || 
|-id=481 bgcolor=#d6d6d6
| 428481 ||  || — || November 2, 2007 || Kitt Peak || Spacewatch || — || align=right | 6.9 km || 
|-id=482 bgcolor=#fefefe
| 428482 ||  || — || November 2, 2007 || Kitt Peak || Spacewatch || — || align=right data-sort-value="0.65" | 650 m || 
|-id=483 bgcolor=#d6d6d6
| 428483 ||  || — || October 9, 2007 || Kitt Peak || Spacewatch || — || align=right | 3.4 km || 
|-id=484 bgcolor=#fefefe
| 428484 ||  || — || November 7, 2007 || Bisei SG Center || BATTeRS || — || align=right data-sort-value="0.72" | 720 m || 
|-id=485 bgcolor=#d6d6d6
| 428485 ||  || — || November 2, 2007 || Catalina || CSS || — || align=right | 3.2 km || 
|-id=486 bgcolor=#fefefe
| 428486 ||  || — || November 7, 2007 || Catalina || CSS || — || align=right data-sort-value="0.72" | 720 m || 
|-id=487 bgcolor=#d6d6d6
| 428487 ||  || — || October 16, 2007 || Mount Lemmon || Mount Lemmon Survey || — || align=right | 2.9 km || 
|-id=488 bgcolor=#d6d6d6
| 428488 ||  || — || September 18, 2007 || Kitt Peak || Spacewatch || — || align=right | 2.4 km || 
|-id=489 bgcolor=#d6d6d6
| 428489 ||  || — || October 15, 2007 || Kitt Peak || Spacewatch || — || align=right | 3.6 km || 
|-id=490 bgcolor=#d6d6d6
| 428490 ||  || — || November 9, 2007 || Kitt Peak || Spacewatch || — || align=right | 3.4 km || 
|-id=491 bgcolor=#fefefe
| 428491 ||  || — || November 9, 2007 || Kitt Peak || Spacewatch || — || align=right data-sort-value="0.66" | 660 m || 
|-id=492 bgcolor=#fefefe
| 428492 ||  || — || November 9, 2007 || Kitt Peak || Spacewatch || — || align=right data-sort-value="0.63" | 630 m || 
|-id=493 bgcolor=#d6d6d6
| 428493 ||  || — || November 11, 2007 || Catalina || CSS || Tj (2.97) || align=right | 4.5 km || 
|-id=494 bgcolor=#d6d6d6
| 428494 ||  || — || November 11, 2007 || Catalina || CSS || — || align=right | 3.0 km || 
|-id=495 bgcolor=#d6d6d6
| 428495 ||  || — || November 12, 2007 || Mount Lemmon || Mount Lemmon Survey || — || align=right | 4.6 km || 
|-id=496 bgcolor=#d6d6d6
| 428496 ||  || — || November 3, 2007 || Kitt Peak || Spacewatch || — || align=right | 2.7 km || 
|-id=497 bgcolor=#fefefe
| 428497 ||  || — || November 1, 2007 || Kitt Peak || Spacewatch || — || align=right data-sort-value="0.73" | 730 m || 
|-id=498 bgcolor=#fefefe
| 428498 ||  || — || November 3, 2007 || Kitt Peak || Spacewatch || — || align=right data-sort-value="0.66" | 660 m || 
|-id=499 bgcolor=#d6d6d6
| 428499 ||  || — || November 17, 2007 || Vicques || M. Ory || — || align=right | 3.9 km || 
|-id=500 bgcolor=#d6d6d6
| 428500 ||  || — || November 18, 2007 || Mount Lemmon || Mount Lemmon Survey || — || align=right | 3.1 km || 
|}

428501–428600 

|-bgcolor=#d6d6d6
| 428501 ||  || — || November 18, 2007 || Mount Lemmon || Mount Lemmon Survey || — || align=right | 2.8 km || 
|-id=502 bgcolor=#d6d6d6
| 428502 ||  || — || November 19, 2007 || Mount Lemmon || Mount Lemmon Survey || — || align=right | 2.3 km || 
|-id=503 bgcolor=#d6d6d6
| 428503 ||  || — || October 19, 1995 || Kitt Peak || Spacewatch || — || align=right | 2.6 km || 
|-id=504 bgcolor=#fefefe
| 428504 ||  || — || December 10, 2007 || Socorro || LINEAR || (2076) || align=right data-sort-value="0.98" | 980 m || 
|-id=505 bgcolor=#d6d6d6
| 428505 ||  || — || November 12, 2007 || Socorro || LINEAR || — || align=right | 3.9 km || 
|-id=506 bgcolor=#fefefe
| 428506 ||  || — || December 5, 2007 || Mount Lemmon || Mount Lemmon Survey || — || align=right data-sort-value="0.79" | 790 m || 
|-id=507 bgcolor=#FA8072
| 428507 ||  || — || December 3, 2007 || Socorro || LINEAR || — || align=right data-sort-value="0.69" | 690 m || 
|-id=508 bgcolor=#d6d6d6
| 428508 ||  || — || December 16, 2007 || Kitt Peak || Spacewatch || — || align=right | 3.3 km || 
|-id=509 bgcolor=#fefefe
| 428509 ||  || — || December 4, 2007 || Kitt Peak || Spacewatch || — || align=right data-sort-value="0.85" | 850 m || 
|-id=510 bgcolor=#d6d6d6
| 428510 ||  || — || December 16, 2007 || Kitt Peak || Spacewatch || (260)7:4 || align=right | 3.2 km || 
|-id=511 bgcolor=#d6d6d6
| 428511 ||  || — || December 16, 2007 || Kitt Peak || Spacewatch || — || align=right | 3.9 km || 
|-id=512 bgcolor=#fefefe
| 428512 ||  || — || December 30, 2007 || Kitt Peak || Spacewatch || — || align=right data-sort-value="0.62" | 620 m || 
|-id=513 bgcolor=#d6d6d6
| 428513 ||  || — || December 6, 2007 || Kitt Peak || Spacewatch || — || align=right | 3.4 km || 
|-id=514 bgcolor=#fefefe
| 428514 ||  || — || December 30, 2007 || Mount Lemmon || Mount Lemmon Survey || MAS || align=right data-sort-value="0.55" | 550 m || 
|-id=515 bgcolor=#fefefe
| 428515 ||  || — || December 31, 2007 || Kitt Peak || Spacewatch || — || align=right data-sort-value="0.52" | 520 m || 
|-id=516 bgcolor=#fefefe
| 428516 ||  || — || November 11, 2007 || Mount Lemmon || Mount Lemmon Survey || — || align=right data-sort-value="0.71" | 710 m || 
|-id=517 bgcolor=#fefefe
| 428517 ||  || — || December 31, 2007 || Kitt Peak || Spacewatch || — || align=right data-sort-value="0.71" | 710 m || 
|-id=518 bgcolor=#fefefe
| 428518 ||  || — || January 10, 2008 || Kitt Peak || Spacewatch || — || align=right data-sort-value="0.77" | 770 m || 
|-id=519 bgcolor=#FA8072
| 428519 ||  || — || January 10, 2008 || Kitt Peak || Spacewatch || — || align=right data-sort-value="0.55" | 550 m || 
|-id=520 bgcolor=#fefefe
| 428520 ||  || — || January 10, 2008 || Mount Lemmon || Mount Lemmon Survey || critical || align=right data-sort-value="0.68" | 680 m || 
|-id=521 bgcolor=#fefefe
| 428521 ||  || — || January 10, 2008 || Kitt Peak || Spacewatch || — || align=right data-sort-value="0.73" | 730 m || 
|-id=522 bgcolor=#fefefe
| 428522 ||  || — || January 10, 2008 || Mount Lemmon || Mount Lemmon Survey || — || align=right data-sort-value="0.74" | 740 m || 
|-id=523 bgcolor=#fefefe
| 428523 ||  || — || January 10, 2008 || Kitt Peak || Spacewatch || — || align=right data-sort-value="0.65" | 650 m || 
|-id=524 bgcolor=#fefefe
| 428524 ||  || — || January 10, 2008 || Kitt Peak || Spacewatch || — || align=right data-sort-value="0.70" | 700 m || 
|-id=525 bgcolor=#fefefe
| 428525 ||  || — || January 12, 2008 || Kitt Peak || Spacewatch || — || align=right data-sort-value="0.84" | 840 m || 
|-id=526 bgcolor=#fefefe
| 428526 ||  || — || January 12, 2008 || Kitt Peak || Spacewatch || — || align=right data-sort-value="0.62" | 620 m || 
|-id=527 bgcolor=#fefefe
| 428527 ||  || — || January 15, 2008 || Mount Lemmon || Mount Lemmon Survey || MAS || align=right data-sort-value="0.77" | 770 m || 
|-id=528 bgcolor=#d6d6d6
| 428528 ||  || — || January 13, 2008 || Kitt Peak || Spacewatch || — || align=right | 3.5 km || 
|-id=529 bgcolor=#d6d6d6
| 428529 ||  || — || December 31, 2007 || Kitt Peak || Spacewatch || — || align=right | 3.3 km || 
|-id=530 bgcolor=#fefefe
| 428530 ||  || — || December 31, 2007 || Mount Lemmon || Mount Lemmon Survey || — || align=right data-sort-value="0.83" | 830 m || 
|-id=531 bgcolor=#fefefe
| 428531 ||  || — || November 12, 2007 || Mount Lemmon || Mount Lemmon Survey || — || align=right data-sort-value="0.68" | 680 m || 
|-id=532 bgcolor=#fefefe
| 428532 ||  || — || January 15, 2008 || Kitt Peak || Spacewatch || — || align=right data-sort-value="0.65" | 650 m || 
|-id=533 bgcolor=#fefefe
| 428533 ||  || — || December 30, 2007 || Mount Lemmon || Mount Lemmon Survey || — || align=right data-sort-value="0.65" | 650 m || 
|-id=534 bgcolor=#d6d6d6
| 428534 ||  || — || January 10, 2008 || Mount Lemmon || Mount Lemmon Survey || — || align=right | 3.6 km || 
|-id=535 bgcolor=#fefefe
| 428535 ||  || — || December 14, 2007 || Mount Lemmon || Mount Lemmon Survey || — || align=right data-sort-value="0.68" | 680 m || 
|-id=536 bgcolor=#fefefe
| 428536 ||  || — || December 30, 2007 || Kitt Peak || Spacewatch || — || align=right data-sort-value="0.75" | 750 m || 
|-id=537 bgcolor=#fefefe
| 428537 ||  || — || January 30, 2008 || Mount Lemmon || Mount Lemmon Survey || — || align=right data-sort-value="0.75" | 750 m || 
|-id=538 bgcolor=#fefefe
| 428538 ||  || — || January 30, 2008 || Mount Lemmon || Mount Lemmon Survey || — || align=right data-sort-value="0.59" | 590 m || 
|-id=539 bgcolor=#fefefe
| 428539 ||  || — || January 20, 2008 || Mount Lemmon || Mount Lemmon Survey || — || align=right data-sort-value="0.71" | 710 m || 
|-id=540 bgcolor=#d6d6d6
| 428540 ||  || — || November 19, 2007 || Mount Lemmon || Mount Lemmon Survey || 7:4 || align=right | 3.7 km || 
|-id=541 bgcolor=#fefefe
| 428541 ||  || — || January 30, 2008 || Kitt Peak || Spacewatch || — || align=right data-sort-value="0.74" | 740 m || 
|-id=542 bgcolor=#fefefe
| 428542 ||  || — || February 3, 2008 || Kitt Peak || Spacewatch || V || align=right data-sort-value="0.64" | 640 m || 
|-id=543 bgcolor=#fefefe
| 428543 ||  || — || February 3, 2008 || Kitt Peak || Spacewatch || — || align=right data-sort-value="0.71" | 710 m || 
|-id=544 bgcolor=#fefefe
| 428544 ||  || — || January 20, 2008 || Mount Lemmon || Mount Lemmon Survey || — || align=right data-sort-value="0.81" | 810 m || 
|-id=545 bgcolor=#fefefe
| 428545 ||  || — || February 2, 2008 || Kitt Peak || Spacewatch || — || align=right data-sort-value="0.55" | 550 m || 
|-id=546 bgcolor=#fefefe
| 428546 ||  || — || February 2, 2008 || Kitt Peak || Spacewatch || — || align=right data-sort-value="0.93" | 930 m || 
|-id=547 bgcolor=#fefefe
| 428547 ||  || — || December 31, 2007 || Mount Lemmon || Mount Lemmon Survey || — || align=right data-sort-value="0.96" | 960 m || 
|-id=548 bgcolor=#fefefe
| 428548 ||  || — || February 2, 2008 || Kitt Peak || Spacewatch || — || align=right data-sort-value="0.89" | 890 m || 
|-id=549 bgcolor=#fefefe
| 428549 ||  || — || February 7, 2008 || Kitt Peak || Spacewatch || — || align=right data-sort-value="0.67" | 670 m || 
|-id=550 bgcolor=#fefefe
| 428550 ||  || — || December 20, 2007 || Mount Lemmon || Mount Lemmon Survey || — || align=right data-sort-value="0.64" | 640 m || 
|-id=551 bgcolor=#fefefe
| 428551 ||  || — || February 8, 2008 || Mount Lemmon || Mount Lemmon Survey || — || align=right data-sort-value="0.65" | 650 m || 
|-id=552 bgcolor=#fefefe
| 428552 ||  || — || February 8, 2008 || Mount Lemmon || Mount Lemmon Survey || — || align=right data-sort-value="0.65" | 650 m || 
|-id=553 bgcolor=#fefefe
| 428553 ||  || — || January 16, 2008 || Mount Lemmon || Mount Lemmon Survey || — || align=right data-sort-value="0.64" | 640 m || 
|-id=554 bgcolor=#fefefe
| 428554 ||  || — || February 6, 2008 || Catalina || CSS || — || align=right data-sort-value="0.74" | 740 m || 
|-id=555 bgcolor=#fefefe
| 428555 ||  || — || January 18, 2008 || Mount Lemmon || Mount Lemmon Survey || (2076) || align=right data-sort-value="0.78" | 780 m || 
|-id=556 bgcolor=#fefefe
| 428556 ||  || — || February 10, 2008 || Marly || P. Kocher || — || align=right data-sort-value="0.94" | 940 m || 
|-id=557 bgcolor=#fefefe
| 428557 ||  || — || February 9, 2008 || Kitt Peak || Spacewatch || — || align=right data-sort-value="0.78" | 780 m || 
|-id=558 bgcolor=#d6d6d6
| 428558 ||  || — || January 13, 2008 || Kitt Peak || Spacewatch || VER || align=right | 3.7 km || 
|-id=559 bgcolor=#fefefe
| 428559 ||  || — || January 13, 2008 || Kitt Peak || Spacewatch || — || align=right data-sort-value="0.74" | 740 m || 
|-id=560 bgcolor=#fefefe
| 428560 ||  || — || February 8, 2008 || Kitt Peak || Spacewatch || critical || align=right data-sort-value="0.57" | 570 m || 
|-id=561 bgcolor=#fefefe
| 428561 ||  || — || January 30, 2008 || Mount Lemmon || Mount Lemmon Survey || — || align=right data-sort-value="0.69" | 690 m || 
|-id=562 bgcolor=#fefefe
| 428562 ||  || — || February 8, 2008 || Kitt Peak || Spacewatch || — || align=right data-sort-value="0.71" | 710 m || 
|-id=563 bgcolor=#fefefe
| 428563 ||  || — || February 9, 2008 || Kitt Peak || Spacewatch || — || align=right data-sort-value="0.74" | 740 m || 
|-id=564 bgcolor=#fefefe
| 428564 ||  || — || February 2, 2008 || Kitt Peak || Spacewatch || — || align=right data-sort-value="0.84" | 840 m || 
|-id=565 bgcolor=#fefefe
| 428565 ||  || — || February 9, 2008 || Kitt Peak || Spacewatch || — || align=right data-sort-value="0.77" | 770 m || 
|-id=566 bgcolor=#fefefe
| 428566 ||  || — || February 9, 2008 || Kitt Peak || Spacewatch || — || align=right data-sort-value="0.77" | 770 m || 
|-id=567 bgcolor=#fefefe
| 428567 ||  || — || February 2, 2008 || Kitt Peak || Spacewatch || V || align=right data-sort-value="0.54" | 540 m || 
|-id=568 bgcolor=#fefefe
| 428568 ||  || — || February 10, 2008 || Socorro || LINEAR || — || align=right | 1.3 km || 
|-id=569 bgcolor=#fefefe
| 428569 ||  || — || February 10, 2008 || Mount Lemmon || Mount Lemmon Survey || ERI || align=right | 1.2 km || 
|-id=570 bgcolor=#fefefe
| 428570 ||  || — || February 8, 2008 || Kitt Peak || Spacewatch || — || align=right data-sort-value="0.68" | 680 m || 
|-id=571 bgcolor=#fefefe
| 428571 ||  || — || February 24, 2008 || Kitt Peak || Spacewatch || — || align=right data-sort-value="0.81" | 810 m || 
|-id=572 bgcolor=#fefefe
| 428572 ||  || — || January 11, 2008 || Kitt Peak || Spacewatch || — || align=right data-sort-value="0.77" | 770 m || 
|-id=573 bgcolor=#fefefe
| 428573 ||  || — || February 28, 2008 || Mount Lemmon || Mount Lemmon Survey || — || align=right data-sort-value="0.70" | 700 m || 
|-id=574 bgcolor=#fefefe
| 428574 ||  || — || January 31, 2008 || Catalina || CSS || — || align=right data-sort-value="0.86" | 860 m || 
|-id=575 bgcolor=#fefefe
| 428575 ||  || — || February 26, 2008 || Mount Lemmon || Mount Lemmon Survey || — || align=right | 2.4 km || 
|-id=576 bgcolor=#fefefe
| 428576 ||  || — || February 28, 2008 || Mount Lemmon || Mount Lemmon Survey || — || align=right data-sort-value="0.76" | 760 m || 
|-id=577 bgcolor=#fefefe
| 428577 ||  || — || February 26, 2008 || Mount Lemmon || Mount Lemmon Survey || — || align=right data-sort-value="0.57" | 570 m || 
|-id=578 bgcolor=#fefefe
| 428578 ||  || — || February 8, 2008 || Kitt Peak || Spacewatch || — || align=right data-sort-value="0.82" | 820 m || 
|-id=579 bgcolor=#fefefe
| 428579 ||  || — || February 27, 2008 || Mount Lemmon || Mount Lemmon Survey || — || align=right data-sort-value="0.73" | 730 m || 
|-id=580 bgcolor=#fefefe
| 428580 ||  || — || February 28, 2008 || Mount Lemmon || Mount Lemmon Survey || V || align=right data-sort-value="0.56" | 560 m || 
|-id=581 bgcolor=#fefefe
| 428581 ||  || — || February 18, 2008 || Mount Lemmon || Mount Lemmon Survey || — || align=right data-sort-value="0.57" | 570 m || 
|-id=582 bgcolor=#fefefe
| 428582 ||  || — || March 9, 2008 || Catalina || CSS || — || align=right | 1.6 km || 
|-id=583 bgcolor=#fefefe
| 428583 ||  || — || March 1, 2008 || Kitt Peak || Spacewatch || — || align=right data-sort-value="0.55" | 550 m || 
|-id=584 bgcolor=#fefefe
| 428584 ||  || — || March 1, 2008 || Kitt Peak || Spacewatch || NYS || align=right data-sort-value="0.65" | 650 m || 
|-id=585 bgcolor=#fefefe
| 428585 ||  || — || March 1, 2008 || Kitt Peak || Spacewatch || — || align=right data-sort-value="0.75" | 750 m || 
|-id=586 bgcolor=#fefefe
| 428586 ||  || — || March 2, 2008 || Kitt Peak || Spacewatch || — || align=right data-sort-value="0.71" | 710 m || 
|-id=587 bgcolor=#fefefe
| 428587 ||  || — || January 30, 2008 || Mount Lemmon || Mount Lemmon Survey || — || align=right data-sort-value="0.81" | 810 m || 
|-id=588 bgcolor=#fefefe
| 428588 ||  || — || February 12, 2008 || Mount Lemmon || Mount Lemmon Survey || — || align=right data-sort-value="0.63" | 630 m || 
|-id=589 bgcolor=#fefefe
| 428589 ||  || — || March 4, 2008 || Kitt Peak || Spacewatch || — || align=right data-sort-value="0.83" | 830 m || 
|-id=590 bgcolor=#fefefe
| 428590 ||  || — || March 6, 2008 || Kitt Peak || Spacewatch || critical || align=right data-sort-value="0.65" | 650 m || 
|-id=591 bgcolor=#fefefe
| 428591 ||  || — || March 6, 2008 || Kitt Peak || Spacewatch || — || align=right data-sort-value="0.78" | 780 m || 
|-id=592 bgcolor=#fefefe
| 428592 ||  || — || March 6, 2008 || Mount Lemmon || Mount Lemmon Survey || — || align=right data-sort-value="0.76" | 760 m || 
|-id=593 bgcolor=#fefefe
| 428593 ||  || — || March 6, 2008 || Mount Lemmon || Mount Lemmon Survey || — || align=right data-sort-value="0.91" | 910 m || 
|-id=594 bgcolor=#fefefe
| 428594 ||  || — || March 7, 2008 || Catalina || CSS || — || align=right data-sort-value="0.85" | 850 m || 
|-id=595 bgcolor=#fefefe
| 428595 ||  || — || March 7, 2008 || Catalina || CSS || — || align=right data-sort-value="0.92" | 920 m || 
|-id=596 bgcolor=#fefefe
| 428596 ||  || — || March 8, 2008 || Mount Lemmon || Mount Lemmon Survey || — || align=right data-sort-value="0.73" | 730 m || 
|-id=597 bgcolor=#fefefe
| 428597 ||  || — || February 7, 2008 || Kitt Peak || Spacewatch || — || align=right data-sort-value="0.63" | 630 m || 
|-id=598 bgcolor=#fefefe
| 428598 ||  || — || March 7, 2008 || Kitt Peak || Spacewatch || — || align=right data-sort-value="0.74" | 740 m || 
|-id=599 bgcolor=#fefefe
| 428599 ||  || — || February 28, 2008 || Kitt Peak || Spacewatch || — || align=right data-sort-value="0.82" | 820 m || 
|-id=600 bgcolor=#fefefe
| 428600 ||  || — || March 7, 2008 || Kitt Peak || Spacewatch || — || align=right | 1.1 km || 
|}

428601–428700 

|-bgcolor=#FA8072
| 428601 ||  || — || November 7, 2007 || Mount Lemmon || Mount Lemmon Survey || — || align=right data-sort-value="0.95" | 950 m || 
|-id=602 bgcolor=#fefefe
| 428602 ||  || — || March 5, 2008 || Mount Lemmon || Mount Lemmon Survey || — || align=right data-sort-value="0.61" | 610 m || 
|-id=603 bgcolor=#fefefe
| 428603 ||  || — || March 9, 2008 || Kitt Peak || Spacewatch || — || align=right data-sort-value="0.77" | 770 m || 
|-id=604 bgcolor=#fefefe
| 428604 ||  || — || February 10, 2008 || Mount Lemmon || Mount Lemmon Survey || (2076) || align=right data-sort-value="0.87" | 870 m || 
|-id=605 bgcolor=#fefefe
| 428605 ||  || — || March 11, 2008 || Kitt Peak || Spacewatch || — || align=right data-sort-value="0.87" | 870 m || 
|-id=606 bgcolor=#fefefe
| 428606 ||  || — || March 11, 2008 || Kitt Peak || Spacewatch || NYS || align=right data-sort-value="0.53" | 530 m || 
|-id=607 bgcolor=#fefefe
| 428607 ||  || — || March 14, 2008 || Catalina || CSS || — || align=right data-sort-value="0.90" | 900 m || 
|-id=608 bgcolor=#fefefe
| 428608 ||  || — || February 10, 2008 || Mount Lemmon || Mount Lemmon Survey || — || align=right data-sort-value="0.72" | 720 m || 
|-id=609 bgcolor=#fefefe
| 428609 ||  || — || March 2, 2008 || Kitt Peak || Spacewatch || V || align=right data-sort-value="0.66" | 660 m || 
|-id=610 bgcolor=#fefefe
| 428610 ||  || — || March 5, 2008 || Kitt Peak || Spacewatch || NYS || align=right data-sort-value="0.52" | 520 m || 
|-id=611 bgcolor=#fefefe
| 428611 ||  || — || March 5, 2008 || Kitt Peak || Spacewatch || NYS || align=right data-sort-value="0.57" | 570 m || 
|-id=612 bgcolor=#fefefe
| 428612 ||  || — || March 3, 2008 || Kitt Peak || Spacewatch || — || align=right data-sort-value="0.81" | 810 m || 
|-id=613 bgcolor=#fefefe
| 428613 ||  || — || March 4, 2008 || Kitt Peak || Spacewatch || — || align=right data-sort-value="0.73" | 730 m || 
|-id=614 bgcolor=#fefefe
| 428614 ||  || — || March 15, 2008 || Kitt Peak || Spacewatch || V || align=right data-sort-value="0.52" | 520 m || 
|-id=615 bgcolor=#fefefe
| 428615 ||  || — || March 25, 2008 || Kitt Peak || Spacewatch || — || align=right data-sort-value="0.86" | 860 m || 
|-id=616 bgcolor=#fefefe
| 428616 ||  || — || March 28, 2008 || Grove Creek || F. Tozzi || — || align=right | 1.3 km || 
|-id=617 bgcolor=#fefefe
| 428617 ||  || — || March 26, 2008 || Kitt Peak || Spacewatch || — || align=right data-sort-value="0.90" | 900 m || 
|-id=618 bgcolor=#fefefe
| 428618 ||  || — || March 26, 2008 || Kitt Peak || Spacewatch || — || align=right data-sort-value="0.87" | 870 m || 
|-id=619 bgcolor=#fefefe
| 428619 ||  || — || March 28, 2008 || Mount Lemmon || Mount Lemmon Survey || — || align=right data-sort-value="0.86" | 860 m || 
|-id=620 bgcolor=#fefefe
| 428620 ||  || — || March 28, 2008 || Kitt Peak || Spacewatch || — || align=right data-sort-value="0.62" | 620 m || 
|-id=621 bgcolor=#fefefe
| 428621 ||  || — || March 28, 2008 || Mount Lemmon || Mount Lemmon Survey || — || align=right data-sort-value="0.65" | 650 m || 
|-id=622 bgcolor=#d6d6d6
| 428622 ||  || — || March 5, 2008 || Kitt Peak || Spacewatch || 3:2 || align=right | 5.5 km || 
|-id=623 bgcolor=#fefefe
| 428623 ||  || — || March 28, 2008 || Kitt Peak || Spacewatch || — || align=right data-sort-value="0.75" | 750 m || 
|-id=624 bgcolor=#fefefe
| 428624 ||  || — || March 28, 2008 || Mount Lemmon || Mount Lemmon Survey || — || align=right data-sort-value="0.94" | 940 m || 
|-id=625 bgcolor=#fefefe
| 428625 ||  || — || March 28, 2008 || Mount Lemmon || Mount Lemmon Survey || — || align=right data-sort-value="0.75" | 750 m || 
|-id=626 bgcolor=#fefefe
| 428626 ||  || — || March 29, 2008 || Catalina || CSS || (2076) || align=right data-sort-value="0.94" | 940 m || 
|-id=627 bgcolor=#fefefe
| 428627 ||  || — || March 27, 2008 || Kitt Peak || Spacewatch || — || align=right data-sort-value="0.88" | 880 m || 
|-id=628 bgcolor=#fefefe
| 428628 ||  || — || November 16, 1995 || Kitt Peak || Spacewatch || — || align=right data-sort-value="0.86" | 860 m || 
|-id=629 bgcolor=#fefefe
| 428629 ||  || — || March 28, 2008 || Kitt Peak || Spacewatch || — || align=right data-sort-value="0.90" | 900 m || 
|-id=630 bgcolor=#fefefe
| 428630 ||  || — || March 28, 2008 || Kitt Peak || Spacewatch || critical || align=right data-sort-value="0.62" | 620 m || 
|-id=631 bgcolor=#fefefe
| 428631 ||  || — || March 27, 2008 || Mount Lemmon || Mount Lemmon Survey || MAS || align=right data-sort-value="0.62" | 620 m || 
|-id=632 bgcolor=#fefefe
| 428632 ||  || — || March 11, 2008 || Kitt Peak || Spacewatch || — || align=right data-sort-value="0.62" | 620 m || 
|-id=633 bgcolor=#fefefe
| 428633 ||  || — || March 28, 2008 || Mount Lemmon || Mount Lemmon Survey || — || align=right data-sort-value="0.82" | 820 m || 
|-id=634 bgcolor=#fefefe
| 428634 ||  || — || March 29, 2008 || Mount Lemmon || Mount Lemmon Survey || — || align=right data-sort-value="0.79" | 790 m || 
|-id=635 bgcolor=#fefefe
| 428635 ||  || — || December 13, 2006 || Kitt Peak || Spacewatch || — || align=right | 1.1 km || 
|-id=636 bgcolor=#fefefe
| 428636 ||  || — || March 31, 2008 || Kitt Peak || Spacewatch || MAS || align=right data-sort-value="0.74" | 740 m || 
|-id=637 bgcolor=#fefefe
| 428637 ||  || — || March 31, 2008 || Mount Lemmon || Mount Lemmon Survey || V || align=right data-sort-value="0.68" | 680 m || 
|-id=638 bgcolor=#fefefe
| 428638 ||  || — || March 27, 2008 || Kitt Peak || Spacewatch || NYS || align=right data-sort-value="0.65" | 650 m || 
|-id=639 bgcolor=#fefefe
| 428639 ||  || — || March 28, 2008 || Mount Lemmon || Mount Lemmon Survey || — || align=right data-sort-value="0.73" | 730 m || 
|-id=640 bgcolor=#fefefe
| 428640 ||  || — || March 29, 2008 || Kitt Peak || Spacewatch || — || align=right data-sort-value="0.84" | 840 m || 
|-id=641 bgcolor=#fefefe
| 428641 ||  || — || March 31, 2008 || Kitt Peak || Spacewatch || NYS || align=right data-sort-value="0.60" | 600 m || 
|-id=642 bgcolor=#fefefe
| 428642 ||  || — || March 13, 2008 || Catalina || CSS || — || align=right data-sort-value="0.95" | 950 m || 
|-id=643 bgcolor=#fefefe
| 428643 ||  || — || April 1, 2008 || Kitt Peak || Spacewatch || NYS || align=right data-sort-value="0.76" | 760 m || 
|-id=644 bgcolor=#fefefe
| 428644 ||  || — || March 10, 2008 || Mount Lemmon || Mount Lemmon Survey || — || align=right | 1.1 km || 
|-id=645 bgcolor=#fefefe
| 428645 ||  || — || April 1, 2008 || Kitt Peak || Spacewatch || — || align=right data-sort-value="0.67" | 670 m || 
|-id=646 bgcolor=#fefefe
| 428646 ||  || — || April 1, 2008 || Kitt Peak || Spacewatch || MAS || align=right data-sort-value="0.64" | 640 m || 
|-id=647 bgcolor=#fefefe
| 428647 ||  || — || April 1, 2008 || Kitt Peak || Spacewatch || MAS || align=right data-sort-value="0.68" | 680 m || 
|-id=648 bgcolor=#fefefe
| 428648 ||  || — || March 12, 2008 || Kitt Peak || Spacewatch || V || align=right data-sort-value="0.59" | 590 m || 
|-id=649 bgcolor=#fefefe
| 428649 ||  || — || April 3, 2008 || Mount Lemmon || Mount Lemmon Survey || MAS || align=right data-sort-value="0.65" | 650 m || 
|-id=650 bgcolor=#fefefe
| 428650 ||  || — || April 3, 2008 || Mount Lemmon || Mount Lemmon Survey || — || align=right data-sort-value="0.90" | 900 m || 
|-id=651 bgcolor=#fefefe
| 428651 ||  || — || April 4, 2008 || Mount Lemmon || Mount Lemmon Survey || — || align=right data-sort-value="0.86" | 860 m || 
|-id=652 bgcolor=#fefefe
| 428652 ||  || — || April 4, 2008 || Kitt Peak || Spacewatch || — || align=right data-sort-value="0.66" | 660 m || 
|-id=653 bgcolor=#fefefe
| 428653 ||  || — || April 5, 2008 || Mount Lemmon || Mount Lemmon Survey || — || align=right data-sort-value="0.65" | 650 m || 
|-id=654 bgcolor=#fefefe
| 428654 ||  || — || April 5, 2008 || Mount Lemmon || Mount Lemmon Survey || — || align=right data-sort-value="0.76" | 760 m || 
|-id=655 bgcolor=#fefefe
| 428655 ||  || — || April 5, 2008 || Mount Lemmon || Mount Lemmon Survey || — || align=right data-sort-value="0.77" | 770 m || 
|-id=656 bgcolor=#fefefe
| 428656 ||  || — || April 7, 2008 || Mount Lemmon || Mount Lemmon Survey || MAS || align=right data-sort-value="0.71" | 710 m || 
|-id=657 bgcolor=#fefefe
| 428657 ||  || — || April 7, 2008 || Kitt Peak || Spacewatch || — || align=right data-sort-value="0.66" | 660 m || 
|-id=658 bgcolor=#FA8072
| 428658 ||  || — || March 28, 2008 || Kitt Peak || Spacewatch || — || align=right data-sort-value="0.95" | 950 m || 
|-id=659 bgcolor=#fefefe
| 428659 ||  || — || April 8, 2008 || Kitt Peak || Spacewatch || — || align=right data-sort-value="0.75" | 750 m || 
|-id=660 bgcolor=#fefefe
| 428660 ||  || — || April 6, 2008 || Mount Lemmon || Mount Lemmon Survey || V || align=right data-sort-value="0.65" | 650 m || 
|-id=661 bgcolor=#fefefe
| 428661 ||  || — || April 6, 2008 || Mount Lemmon || Mount Lemmon Survey || NYS || align=right data-sort-value="0.69" | 690 m || 
|-id=662 bgcolor=#fefefe
| 428662 ||  || — || March 28, 2008 || Kitt Peak || Spacewatch || — || align=right data-sort-value="0.81" | 810 m || 
|-id=663 bgcolor=#fefefe
| 428663 ||  || — || April 9, 2008 || Kitt Peak || Spacewatch || NYS || align=right data-sort-value="0.69" | 690 m || 
|-id=664 bgcolor=#fefefe
| 428664 ||  || — || April 9, 2008 || Kitt Peak || Spacewatch || — || align=right data-sort-value="0.82" | 820 m || 
|-id=665 bgcolor=#fefefe
| 428665 ||  || — || March 10, 2008 || Mount Lemmon || Mount Lemmon Survey || — || align=right data-sort-value="0.90" | 900 m || 
|-id=666 bgcolor=#fefefe
| 428666 ||  || — || April 9, 2008 || Kitt Peak || Spacewatch || NYS || align=right data-sort-value="0.55" | 550 m || 
|-id=667 bgcolor=#fefefe
| 428667 ||  || — || March 10, 2008 || Kitt Peak || Spacewatch || — || align=right data-sort-value="0.69" | 690 m || 
|-id=668 bgcolor=#fefefe
| 428668 ||  || — || April 13, 2008 || Kitt Peak || Spacewatch || NYS || align=right data-sort-value="0.66" | 660 m || 
|-id=669 bgcolor=#fefefe
| 428669 ||  || — || October 31, 2006 || Mount Lemmon || Mount Lemmon Survey || MAS || align=right data-sort-value="0.57" | 570 m || 
|-id=670 bgcolor=#fefefe
| 428670 ||  || — || April 5, 2008 || Catalina || CSS || — || align=right data-sort-value="0.90" | 900 m || 
|-id=671 bgcolor=#fefefe
| 428671 ||  || — || April 15, 2008 || Mount Lemmon || Mount Lemmon Survey || — || align=right data-sort-value="0.80" | 800 m || 
|-id=672 bgcolor=#fefefe
| 428672 ||  || — || April 24, 2008 || Kitt Peak || Spacewatch || — || align=right data-sort-value="0.82" | 820 m || 
|-id=673 bgcolor=#fefefe
| 428673 ||  || — || January 30, 2004 || Kitt Peak || Spacewatch || MAS || align=right data-sort-value="0.64" | 640 m || 
|-id=674 bgcolor=#fefefe
| 428674 ||  || — || April 24, 2008 || Kitt Peak || Spacewatch || — || align=right data-sort-value="0.71" | 710 m || 
|-id=675 bgcolor=#fefefe
| 428675 ||  || — || April 24, 2008 || Kitt Peak || Spacewatch || — || align=right data-sort-value="0.75" | 750 m || 
|-id=676 bgcolor=#fefefe
| 428676 ||  || — || April 24, 2008 || Kitt Peak || Spacewatch || V || align=right data-sort-value="0.77" | 770 m || 
|-id=677 bgcolor=#fefefe
| 428677 ||  || — || April 3, 2008 || Mount Lemmon || Mount Lemmon Survey || — || align=right data-sort-value="0.77" | 770 m || 
|-id=678 bgcolor=#fefefe
| 428678 ||  || — || April 29, 2008 || Kitt Peak || Spacewatch || — || align=right | 1.1 km || 
|-id=679 bgcolor=#fefefe
| 428679 ||  || — || April 29, 2008 || Kitt Peak || Spacewatch || — || align=right data-sort-value="0.75" | 750 m || 
|-id=680 bgcolor=#fefefe
| 428680 ||  || — || April 30, 2008 || Socorro || LINEAR || (5026) || align=right data-sort-value="0.81" | 810 m || 
|-id=681 bgcolor=#FFC2E0
| 428681 ||  || — || May 5, 2008 || Siding Spring || SSS || AMO +1kmcritical || align=right data-sort-value="0.89" | 890 m || 
|-id=682 bgcolor=#fefefe
| 428682 ||  || — || May 11, 2008 || Kitt Peak || Spacewatch || NYScritical || align=right data-sort-value="0.58" | 580 m || 
|-id=683 bgcolor=#fefefe
| 428683 ||  || — || May 13, 2008 || Mount Lemmon || Mount Lemmon Survey || — || align=right | 1.0 km || 
|-id=684 bgcolor=#fefefe
| 428684 ||  || — || May 5, 2008 || Kitt Peak || Spacewatch || — || align=right data-sort-value="0.91" | 910 m || 
|-id=685 bgcolor=#E9E9E9
| 428685 ||  || — || May 3, 2008 || Mount Lemmon || Mount Lemmon Survey || MAR || align=right data-sort-value="0.93" | 930 m || 
|-id=686 bgcolor=#E9E9E9
| 428686 ||  || — || May 30, 2008 || Kitt Peak || Spacewatch || — || align=right data-sort-value="0.92" | 920 m || 
|-id=687 bgcolor=#fefefe
| 428687 ||  || — || April 15, 2008 || Mount Lemmon || Mount Lemmon Survey || — || align=right data-sort-value="0.92" | 920 m || 
|-id=688 bgcolor=#E9E9E9
| 428688 ||  || — || May 8, 2008 || Mount Lemmon || Mount Lemmon Survey || — || align=right | 1.1 km || 
|-id=689 bgcolor=#E9E9E9
| 428689 ||  || — || May 31, 2008 || Mount Lemmon || Mount Lemmon Survey || — || align=right data-sort-value="0.87" | 870 m || 
|-id=690 bgcolor=#fefefe
| 428690 ||  || — || June 10, 2008 || Kitt Peak || Spacewatch || — || align=right data-sort-value="0.68" | 680 m || 
|-id=691 bgcolor=#E9E9E9
| 428691 ||  || — || June 29, 2008 || Siding Spring || SSS || — || align=right | 1.6 km || 
|-id=692 bgcolor=#E9E9E9
| 428692 ||  || — || May 30, 2008 || Mount Lemmon || Mount Lemmon Survey || — || align=right | 1.5 km || 
|-id=693 bgcolor=#E9E9E9
| 428693 ||  || — || July 28, 2008 || Mount Lemmon || Mount Lemmon Survey || MAR || align=right | 1.2 km || 
|-id=694 bgcolor=#FFC2E0
| 428694 Saule ||  ||  || July 29, 2008 || Baldone || K. Černis, I. Eglītis || APO || align=right data-sort-value="0.47" | 470 m || 
|-id=695 bgcolor=#d6d6d6
| 428695 ||  || — || July 28, 2008 || Siding Spring || SSS || BRA || align=right | 2.0 km || 
|-id=696 bgcolor=#E9E9E9
| 428696 ||  || — || August 2, 2008 || Eygalayes Obs. || P. Sogorb || — || align=right | 2.2 km || 
|-id=697 bgcolor=#E9E9E9
| 428697 ||  || — || August 7, 2008 || Kitt Peak || Spacewatch || EUN || align=right | 1.1 km || 
|-id=698 bgcolor=#E9E9E9
| 428698 ||  || — || August 23, 2008 || La Sagra || OAM Obs. || — || align=right | 1.7 km || 
|-id=699 bgcolor=#E9E9E9
| 428699 ||  || — || August 23, 2008 || Socorro || LINEAR || — || align=right | 2.8 km || 
|-id=700 bgcolor=#E9E9E9
| 428700 ||  || — || August 3, 2008 || Siding Spring || SSS || — || align=right | 2.1 km || 
|}

428701–428800 

|-bgcolor=#E9E9E9
| 428701 ||  || — || August 30, 2008 || La Sagra || OAM Obs. || — || align=right | 2.6 km || 
|-id=702 bgcolor=#fefefe
| 428702 ||  || — || August 23, 2008 || Siding Spring || SSS || H || align=right data-sort-value="0.75" | 750 m || 
|-id=703 bgcolor=#E9E9E9
| 428703 ||  || — || August 24, 2008 || Kitt Peak || Spacewatch || GEF || align=right | 1.4 km || 
|-id=704 bgcolor=#E9E9E9
| 428704 ||  || — || August 24, 2008 || Kitt Peak || Spacewatch || — || align=right | 1.9 km || 
|-id=705 bgcolor=#E9E9E9
| 428705 ||  || — || August 23, 2008 || Socorro || LINEAR || — || align=right | 2.0 km || 
|-id=706 bgcolor=#E9E9E9
| 428706 ||  || — || January 31, 2006 || Catalina || CSS || — || align=right | 2.7 km || 
|-id=707 bgcolor=#E9E9E9
| 428707 ||  || — || August 26, 2008 || Črni Vrh || Črni Vrh || EUN || align=right | 1.5 km || 
|-id=708 bgcolor=#E9E9E9
| 428708 ||  || — || September 2, 2008 || Kitt Peak || Spacewatch || — || align=right | 2.0 km || 
|-id=709 bgcolor=#E9E9E9
| 428709 ||  || — || September 4, 2008 || Kitt Peak || Spacewatch || — || align=right | 2.9 km || 
|-id=710 bgcolor=#d6d6d6
| 428710 ||  || — || September 5, 2008 || Socorro || LINEAR || — || align=right | 4.1 km || 
|-id=711 bgcolor=#E9E9E9
| 428711 ||  || — || September 5, 2008 || Needville || J. Dellinger, C. Sexton || — || align=right | 2.4 km || 
|-id=712 bgcolor=#d6d6d6
| 428712 ||  || — || September 7, 2008 || Dauban || F. Kugel || — || align=right | 2.8 km || 
|-id=713 bgcolor=#E9E9E9
| 428713 ||  || — || September 2, 2008 || Kitt Peak || Spacewatch || — || align=right | 1.9 km || 
|-id=714 bgcolor=#E9E9E9
| 428714 ||  || — || September 2, 2008 || Kitt Peak || Spacewatch || AGN || align=right data-sort-value="0.98" | 980 m || 
|-id=715 bgcolor=#d6d6d6
| 428715 ||  || — || September 2, 2008 || Kitt Peak || Spacewatch || KOR || align=right | 1.1 km || 
|-id=716 bgcolor=#E9E9E9
| 428716 ||  || — || September 2, 2008 || Kitt Peak || Spacewatch || HOF || align=right | 2.2 km || 
|-id=717 bgcolor=#E9E9E9
| 428717 ||  || — || September 2, 2008 || Kitt Peak || Spacewatch || WIT || align=right | 1.2 km || 
|-id=718 bgcolor=#E9E9E9
| 428718 ||  || — || September 2, 2008 || Kitt Peak || Spacewatch || — || align=right | 1.6 km || 
|-id=719 bgcolor=#E9E9E9
| 428719 ||  || — || September 2, 2008 || Kitt Peak || Spacewatch || — || align=right | 1.9 km || 
|-id=720 bgcolor=#C2FFFF
| 428720 ||  || — || September 3, 2008 || Kitt Peak || Spacewatch || L4 || align=right | 8.3 km || 
|-id=721 bgcolor=#E9E9E9
| 428721 ||  || — || October 11, 2004 || Kitt Peak || Spacewatch || — || align=right data-sort-value="0.89" | 890 m || 
|-id=722 bgcolor=#E9E9E9
| 428722 ||  || — || September 3, 2008 || Kitt Peak || Spacewatch || HOF || align=right | 2.0 km || 
|-id=723 bgcolor=#E9E9E9
| 428723 ||  || — || September 3, 2008 || Kitt Peak || Spacewatch || MRX || align=right | 1.1 km || 
|-id=724 bgcolor=#E9E9E9
| 428724 ||  || — || September 4, 2008 || Kitt Peak || Spacewatch || — || align=right | 2.1 km || 
|-id=725 bgcolor=#E9E9E9
| 428725 ||  || — || September 4, 2008 || Kitt Peak || Spacewatch || — || align=right | 2.3 km || 
|-id=726 bgcolor=#E9E9E9
| 428726 ||  || — || September 5, 2008 || Kitt Peak || Spacewatch || (5) || align=right data-sort-value="0.69" | 690 m || 
|-id=727 bgcolor=#E9E9E9
| 428727 ||  || — || September 6, 2008 || Catalina || CSS || — || align=right | 1.8 km || 
|-id=728 bgcolor=#E9E9E9
| 428728 ||  || — || September 4, 2008 || Kitt Peak || Spacewatch || GEF || align=right | 1.1 km || 
|-id=729 bgcolor=#E9E9E9
| 428729 ||  || — || September 4, 2008 || Kitt Peak || Spacewatch || — || align=right | 1.8 km || 
|-id=730 bgcolor=#E9E9E9
| 428730 ||  || — || September 5, 2008 || Kitt Peak || Spacewatch || MAR || align=right | 1.2 km || 
|-id=731 bgcolor=#E9E9E9
| 428731 ||  || — || September 5, 2008 || Kitt Peak || Spacewatch || — || align=right | 1.6 km || 
|-id=732 bgcolor=#C2FFFF
| 428732 ||  || — || September 2, 2008 || Kitt Peak || Spacewatch || L4 || align=right | 10 km || 
|-id=733 bgcolor=#E9E9E9
| 428733 ||  || — || September 6, 2008 || Catalina || CSS || — || align=right | 3.0 km || 
|-id=734 bgcolor=#E9E9E9
| 428734 ||  || — || September 6, 2008 || Mount Lemmon || Mount Lemmon Survey || — || align=right | 2.8 km || 
|-id=735 bgcolor=#E9E9E9
| 428735 ||  || — || September 9, 2008 || Catalina || CSS || — || align=right | 1.8 km || 
|-id=736 bgcolor=#E9E9E9
| 428736 ||  || — || September 2, 2008 || Kitt Peak || Spacewatch || — || align=right data-sort-value="0.94" | 940 m || 
|-id=737 bgcolor=#d6d6d6
| 428737 ||  || — || September 3, 2008 || Kitt Peak || Spacewatch || — || align=right | 1.8 km || 
|-id=738 bgcolor=#E9E9E9
| 428738 ||  || — || September 4, 2008 || Kitt Peak || Spacewatch || — || align=right | 2.1 km || 
|-id=739 bgcolor=#E9E9E9
| 428739 ||  || — || September 2, 2008 || Kitt Peak || Spacewatch || — || align=right | 1.4 km || 
|-id=740 bgcolor=#E9E9E9
| 428740 ||  || — || September 7, 2008 || Mount Lemmon || Mount Lemmon Survey || — || align=right | 1.7 km || 
|-id=741 bgcolor=#E9E9E9
| 428741 ||  || — || September 3, 2008 || Kitt Peak || Spacewatch || — || align=right | 1.8 km || 
|-id=742 bgcolor=#E9E9E9
| 428742 ||  || — || September 5, 2008 || Kitt Peak || Spacewatch || — || align=right | 1.4 km || 
|-id=743 bgcolor=#d6d6d6
| 428743 ||  || — || September 6, 2008 || Kitt Peak || Spacewatch || — || align=right | 2.2 km || 
|-id=744 bgcolor=#E9E9E9
| 428744 ||  || — || September 22, 2008 || Sierra Stars || F. Tozzi || — || align=right | 2.8 km || 
|-id=745 bgcolor=#E9E9E9
| 428745 ||  || — || September 22, 2008 || Socorro || LINEAR || — || align=right | 1.6 km || 
|-id=746 bgcolor=#E9E9E9
| 428746 ||  || — || September 22, 2008 || Socorro || LINEAR || — || align=right | 1.2 km || 
|-id=747 bgcolor=#E9E9E9
| 428747 ||  || — || September 22, 2008 || Socorro || LINEAR || DOR || align=right | 3.4 km || 
|-id=748 bgcolor=#E9E9E9
| 428748 ||  || — || September 19, 2008 || Kitt Peak || Spacewatch || — || align=right | 2.6 km || 
|-id=749 bgcolor=#E9E9E9
| 428749 ||  || — || September 19, 2008 || Kitt Peak || Spacewatch || — || align=right | 1.9 km || 
|-id=750 bgcolor=#d6d6d6
| 428750 ||  || — || September 6, 2008 || Mount Lemmon || Mount Lemmon Survey || — || align=right | 2.2 km || 
|-id=751 bgcolor=#E9E9E9
| 428751 ||  || — || September 20, 2008 || Kitt Peak || Spacewatch || — || align=right | 1.9 km || 
|-id=752 bgcolor=#E9E9E9
| 428752 ||  || — || September 20, 2008 || Kitt Peak || Spacewatch || — || align=right | 2.2 km || 
|-id=753 bgcolor=#E9E9E9
| 428753 ||  || — || September 20, 2008 || Kitt Peak || Spacewatch || — || align=right | 2.0 km || 
|-id=754 bgcolor=#E9E9E9
| 428754 ||  || — || September 20, 2008 || Kitt Peak || Spacewatch || — || align=right | 2.2 km || 
|-id=755 bgcolor=#E9E9E9
| 428755 ||  || — || September 22, 2008 || Kitt Peak || Spacewatch || — || align=right | 2.1 km || 
|-id=756 bgcolor=#E9E9E9
| 428756 ||  || — || September 22, 2008 || Catalina || CSS || BRG || align=right | 1.8 km || 
|-id=757 bgcolor=#E9E9E9
| 428757 ||  || — || September 21, 2008 || Kitt Peak || Spacewatch || — || align=right | 1.5 km || 
|-id=758 bgcolor=#E9E9E9
| 428758 ||  || — || September 21, 2008 || Kitt Peak || Spacewatch || — || align=right | 1.8 km || 
|-id=759 bgcolor=#d6d6d6
| 428759 ||  || — || September 21, 2008 || Mount Lemmon || Mount Lemmon Survey || EOS || align=right | 2.0 km || 
|-id=760 bgcolor=#E9E9E9
| 428760 ||  || — || September 7, 2008 || Mount Lemmon || Mount Lemmon Survey || — || align=right | 1.3 km || 
|-id=761 bgcolor=#d6d6d6
| 428761 ||  || — || September 22, 2008 || Mount Lemmon || Mount Lemmon Survey || TRE || align=right | 1.8 km || 
|-id=762 bgcolor=#E9E9E9
| 428762 ||  || — || September 22, 2008 || Mount Lemmon || Mount Lemmon Survey || — || align=right | 2.6 km || 
|-id=763 bgcolor=#E9E9E9
| 428763 ||  || — || July 29, 2008 || Kitt Peak || Spacewatch || — || align=right | 1.1 km || 
|-id=764 bgcolor=#E9E9E9
| 428764 ||  || — || September 23, 2008 || Kitt Peak || Spacewatch || — || align=right | 1.2 km || 
|-id=765 bgcolor=#E9E9E9
| 428765 ||  || — || September 22, 2008 || Socorro || LINEAR || — || align=right | 1.7 km || 
|-id=766 bgcolor=#E9E9E9
| 428766 ||  || — || September 23, 2008 || Socorro || LINEAR || — || align=right | 2.2 km || 
|-id=767 bgcolor=#E9E9E9
| 428767 ||  || — || September 26, 2008 || Kitt Peak || Spacewatch || — || align=right | 3.0 km || 
|-id=768 bgcolor=#E9E9E9
| 428768 ||  || — || September 28, 2008 || Socorro || LINEAR || — || align=right | 2.2 km || 
|-id=769 bgcolor=#E9E9E9
| 428769 ||  || — || September 22, 2008 || Catalina || CSS || EUN || align=right | 1.6 km || 
|-id=770 bgcolor=#fefefe
| 428770 ||  || — || September 24, 2008 || Kitt Peak || Spacewatch || H || align=right data-sort-value="0.78" | 780 m || 
|-id=771 bgcolor=#E9E9E9
| 428771 ||  || — || September 25, 2008 || Kitt Peak || Spacewatch || HOF || align=right | 3.6 km || 
|-id=772 bgcolor=#d6d6d6
| 428772 ||  || — || September 25, 2008 || Kitt Peak || Spacewatch || BRA || align=right | 1.3 km || 
|-id=773 bgcolor=#E9E9E9
| 428773 ||  || — || September 26, 2008 || Kitt Peak || Spacewatch || — || align=right | 1.4 km || 
|-id=774 bgcolor=#E9E9E9
| 428774 ||  || — || September 26, 2008 || Kitt Peak || Spacewatch || NEM || align=right | 2.3 km || 
|-id=775 bgcolor=#E9E9E9
| 428775 ||  || — || September 26, 2008 || Kitt Peak || Spacewatch || — || align=right | 2.8 km || 
|-id=776 bgcolor=#d6d6d6
| 428776 ||  || — || September 29, 2008 || Mount Lemmon || Mount Lemmon Survey || EOS || align=right | 2.2 km || 
|-id=777 bgcolor=#E9E9E9
| 428777 ||  || — || September 23, 2008 || Kitt Peak || Spacewatch || — || align=right | 2.2 km || 
|-id=778 bgcolor=#E9E9E9
| 428778 ||  || — || September 2, 2008 || Kitt Peak || Spacewatch || — || align=right | 1.9 km || 
|-id=779 bgcolor=#E9E9E9
| 428779 ||  || — || September 27, 2008 || Mount Lemmon || Mount Lemmon Survey || AGN || align=right | 1.1 km || 
|-id=780 bgcolor=#E9E9E9
| 428780 ||  || — || September 28, 2008 || Mount Lemmon || Mount Lemmon Survey || — || align=right | 1.1 km || 
|-id=781 bgcolor=#E9E9E9
| 428781 ||  || — || September 29, 2008 || Catalina || CSS || AGN || align=right | 1.3 km || 
|-id=782 bgcolor=#E9E9E9
| 428782 ||  || — || September 20, 2008 || Mount Lemmon || Mount Lemmon Survey || — || align=right | 1.4 km || 
|-id=783 bgcolor=#E9E9E9
| 428783 ||  || — || September 22, 2008 || Mount Lemmon || Mount Lemmon Survey || — || align=right | 2.5 km || 
|-id=784 bgcolor=#E9E9E9
| 428784 ||  || — || September 22, 2008 || Kitt Peak || Spacewatch || GEF || align=right | 1.2 km || 
|-id=785 bgcolor=#E9E9E9
| 428785 ||  || — || September 23, 2008 || Mount Lemmon || Mount Lemmon Survey || HOF || align=right | 2.1 km || 
|-id=786 bgcolor=#E9E9E9
| 428786 ||  || — || September 25, 2008 || Kitt Peak || Spacewatch || — || align=right | 2.7 km || 
|-id=787 bgcolor=#E9E9E9
| 428787 ||  || — || September 26, 2008 || Kitt Peak || Spacewatch || AGN || align=right | 1.1 km || 
|-id=788 bgcolor=#d6d6d6
| 428788 ||  || — || September 29, 2008 || Mount Lemmon || Mount Lemmon Survey || — || align=right | 2.9 km || 
|-id=789 bgcolor=#E9E9E9
| 428789 ||  || — || September 22, 2008 || Kitt Peak || Spacewatch || (5) || align=right data-sort-value="0.85" | 850 m || 
|-id=790 bgcolor=#E9E9E9
| 428790 ||  || — || September 22, 2008 || Kitt Peak || Spacewatch || — || align=right | 2.4 km || 
|-id=791 bgcolor=#E9E9E9
| 428791 ||  || — || September 23, 2008 || Mount Lemmon || Mount Lemmon Survey || — || align=right | 1.8 km || 
|-id=792 bgcolor=#fefefe
| 428792 ||  || — || January 25, 2007 || Catalina || CSS || H || align=right data-sort-value="0.74" | 740 m || 
|-id=793 bgcolor=#E9E9E9
| 428793 ||  || — || September 22, 2008 || Socorro || LINEAR || — || align=right | 1.6 km || 
|-id=794 bgcolor=#E9E9E9
| 428794 ||  || — || September 22, 2008 || Catalina || CSS || — || align=right | 3.0 km || 
|-id=795 bgcolor=#E9E9E9
| 428795 ||  || — || September 9, 2008 || Kitt Peak || Spacewatch || EUN || align=right | 1.4 km || 
|-id=796 bgcolor=#E9E9E9
| 428796 ||  || — || September 23, 2008 || Catalina || CSS || — || align=right | 1.7 km || 
|-id=797 bgcolor=#E9E9E9
| 428797 ||  || — || September 28, 2008 || Catalina || CSS || — || align=right | 1.7 km || 
|-id=798 bgcolor=#E9E9E9
| 428798 ||  || — || September 24, 2008 || Kitt Peak || Spacewatch || KON || align=right | 2.6 km || 
|-id=799 bgcolor=#E9E9E9
| 428799 ||  || — || September 28, 2008 || Socorro || LINEAR || — || align=right | 1.9 km || 
|-id=800 bgcolor=#fefefe
| 428800 ||  || — || October 4, 2008 || La Sagra || OAM Obs. || H || align=right data-sort-value="0.63" | 630 m || 
|}

428801–428900 

|-bgcolor=#d6d6d6
| 428801 ||  || — || September 6, 2008 || Mount Lemmon || Mount Lemmon Survey || — || align=right | 2.8 km || 
|-id=802 bgcolor=#d6d6d6
| 428802 ||  || — || September 7, 2008 || Mount Lemmon || Mount Lemmon Survey || — || align=right | 2.0 km || 
|-id=803 bgcolor=#fefefe
| 428803 ||  || — || October 7, 2008 || Kachina || J. Hobart || H || align=right data-sort-value="0.52" | 520 m || 
|-id=804 bgcolor=#E9E9E9
| 428804 ||  || — || October 7, 2008 || Great Shefford || P. Birtwhistle || — || align=right | 1.5 km || 
|-id=805 bgcolor=#E9E9E9
| 428805 ||  || — || October 2, 2008 || Mount Lemmon || Mount Lemmon Survey || — || align=right | 2.9 km || 
|-id=806 bgcolor=#fefefe
| 428806 ||  || — || October 9, 2008 || Great Shefford || P. Birtwhistle || H || align=right data-sort-value="0.76" | 760 m || 
|-id=807 bgcolor=#E9E9E9
| 428807 ||  || — || September 22, 2008 || Kitt Peak || Spacewatch || — || align=right | 2.2 km || 
|-id=808 bgcolor=#E9E9E9
| 428808 ||  || — || September 21, 2008 || Kitt Peak || Spacewatch || — || align=right | 1.9 km || 
|-id=809 bgcolor=#E9E9E9
| 428809 ||  || — || October 1, 2008 || Mount Lemmon || Mount Lemmon Survey || AGN || align=right | 1.2 km || 
|-id=810 bgcolor=#d6d6d6
| 428810 ||  || — || October 1, 2008 || Mount Lemmon || Mount Lemmon Survey || — || align=right | 2.8 km || 
|-id=811 bgcolor=#E9E9E9
| 428811 ||  || — || September 4, 2008 || Kitt Peak || Spacewatch || AGN || align=right | 1.00 km || 
|-id=812 bgcolor=#d6d6d6
| 428812 ||  || — || September 20, 2008 || Mount Lemmon || Mount Lemmon Survey || — || align=right | 2.1 km || 
|-id=813 bgcolor=#d6d6d6
| 428813 ||  || — || September 24, 2008 || Kitt Peak || Spacewatch || — || align=right | 2.1 km || 
|-id=814 bgcolor=#d6d6d6
| 428814 ||  || — || September 26, 2008 || Kitt Peak || Spacewatch || KOR || align=right | 1.2 km || 
|-id=815 bgcolor=#E9E9E9
| 428815 ||  || — || October 2, 2008 || Catalina || CSS || — || align=right | 2.8 km || 
|-id=816 bgcolor=#d6d6d6
| 428816 ||  || — || October 2, 2008 || Kitt Peak || Spacewatch || KOR || align=right | 1.3 km || 
|-id=817 bgcolor=#E9E9E9
| 428817 ||  || — || October 2, 2008 || Kitt Peak || Spacewatch || — || align=right | 2.8 km || 
|-id=818 bgcolor=#E9E9E9
| 428818 ||  || — || September 2, 2008 || Kitt Peak || Spacewatch || AST || align=right | 1.6 km || 
|-id=819 bgcolor=#E9E9E9
| 428819 ||  || — || October 2, 2008 || Mount Lemmon || Mount Lemmon Survey || HOF || align=right | 2.3 km || 
|-id=820 bgcolor=#E9E9E9
| 428820 ||  || — || October 3, 2008 || La Sagra || OAM Obs. || MAR || align=right | 1.6 km || 
|-id=821 bgcolor=#d6d6d6
| 428821 ||  || — || October 6, 2008 || Kitt Peak || Spacewatch || — || align=right | 2.1 km || 
|-id=822 bgcolor=#E9E9E9
| 428822 ||  || — || September 23, 2008 || Mount Lemmon || Mount Lemmon Survey || ADE || align=right | 2.2 km || 
|-id=823 bgcolor=#d6d6d6
| 428823 ||  || — || October 6, 2008 || Mount Lemmon || Mount Lemmon Survey || — || align=right | 1.6 km || 
|-id=824 bgcolor=#E9E9E9
| 428824 ||  || — || October 6, 2008 || Mount Lemmon || Mount Lemmon Survey || — || align=right | 1.4 km || 
|-id=825 bgcolor=#fefefe
| 428825 ||  || — || October 6, 2008 || Catalina || CSS || H || align=right data-sort-value="0.81" | 810 m || 
|-id=826 bgcolor=#E9E9E9
| 428826 ||  || — || September 23, 2008 || Catalina || CSS || — || align=right | 2.9 km || 
|-id=827 bgcolor=#E9E9E9
| 428827 ||  || — || October 6, 2008 || Kitt Peak || Spacewatch || (1547) || align=right | 1.8 km || 
|-id=828 bgcolor=#E9E9E9
| 428828 ||  || — || September 23, 2008 || Kitt Peak || Spacewatch || — || align=right data-sort-value="0.96" | 960 m || 
|-id=829 bgcolor=#E9E9E9
| 428829 ||  || — || October 8, 2008 || Mount Lemmon || Mount Lemmon Survey || — || align=right | 2.1 km || 
|-id=830 bgcolor=#E9E9E9
| 428830 ||  || — || October 9, 2008 || Mount Lemmon || Mount Lemmon Survey || AST || align=right | 1.6 km || 
|-id=831 bgcolor=#E9E9E9
| 428831 ||  || — || February 24, 2006 || Kitt Peak || Spacewatch || AGN || align=right | 1.1 km || 
|-id=832 bgcolor=#d6d6d6
| 428832 ||  || — || September 3, 2008 || Kitt Peak || Spacewatch || KOR || align=right | 1.2 km || 
|-id=833 bgcolor=#E9E9E9
| 428833 ||  || — || October 1, 2008 || Kitt Peak || Spacewatch || AGN || align=right data-sort-value="0.95" | 950 m || 
|-id=834 bgcolor=#d6d6d6
| 428834 ||  || — || October 8, 2008 || Mount Lemmon || Mount Lemmon Survey || — || align=right | 1.9 km || 
|-id=835 bgcolor=#d6d6d6
| 428835 ||  || — || October 10, 2008 || Mount Lemmon || Mount Lemmon Survey || — || align=right | 2.8 km || 
|-id=836 bgcolor=#E9E9E9
| 428836 ||  || — || October 2, 2008 || Kitt Peak || Spacewatch || — || align=right | 2.3 km || 
|-id=837 bgcolor=#E9E9E9
| 428837 ||  || — || October 7, 2008 || Mount Lemmon || Mount Lemmon Survey || — || align=right | 1.9 km || 
|-id=838 bgcolor=#E9E9E9
| 428838 ||  || — || September 22, 2008 || Catalina || CSS || ADE || align=right | 2.7 km || 
|-id=839 bgcolor=#fefefe
| 428839 ||  || — || October 25, 2008 || Socorro || LINEAR || H || align=right data-sort-value="0.82" | 820 m || 
|-id=840 bgcolor=#E9E9E9
| 428840 ||  || — || February 20, 2006 || Kitt Peak || Spacewatch || HOF || align=right | 2.6 km || 
|-id=841 bgcolor=#d6d6d6
| 428841 ||  || — || September 24, 2008 || Kitt Peak || Spacewatch || — || align=right | 2.4 km || 
|-id=842 bgcolor=#d6d6d6
| 428842 ||  || — || September 24, 2008 || Mount Lemmon || Mount Lemmon Survey || — || align=right | 2.1 km || 
|-id=843 bgcolor=#d6d6d6
| 428843 ||  || — || September 29, 2003 || Kitt Peak || Spacewatch || — || align=right | 2.5 km || 
|-id=844 bgcolor=#d6d6d6
| 428844 ||  || — || October 20, 2008 || Mount Lemmon || Mount Lemmon Survey || KOR || align=right | 1.2 km || 
|-id=845 bgcolor=#d6d6d6
| 428845 ||  || — || October 6, 2008 || Kitt Peak || Spacewatch || — || align=right | 2.0 km || 
|-id=846 bgcolor=#d6d6d6
| 428846 ||  || — || October 20, 2008 || Kitt Peak || Spacewatch || EOS || align=right | 1.9 km || 
|-id=847 bgcolor=#d6d6d6
| 428847 ||  || — || October 1, 2008 || Kitt Peak || Spacewatch || — || align=right | 2.5 km || 
|-id=848 bgcolor=#E9E9E9
| 428848 ||  || — || September 9, 2008 || Mount Lemmon || Mount Lemmon Survey || HOF || align=right | 2.2 km || 
|-id=849 bgcolor=#E9E9E9
| 428849 ||  || — || October 21, 2008 || Kitt Peak || Spacewatch || — || align=right | 1.7 km || 
|-id=850 bgcolor=#d6d6d6
| 428850 ||  || — || October 21, 2008 || Kitt Peak || Spacewatch || EOS || align=right | 2.2 km || 
|-id=851 bgcolor=#d6d6d6
| 428851 ||  || — || October 21, 2008 || Kitt Peak || Spacewatch || — || align=right | 2.8 km || 
|-id=852 bgcolor=#E9E9E9
| 428852 ||  || — || October 23, 2008 || Kitt Peak || Spacewatch || — || align=right | 2.1 km || 
|-id=853 bgcolor=#d6d6d6
| 428853 ||  || — || October 24, 2008 || Catalina || CSS || — || align=right | 2.6 km || 
|-id=854 bgcolor=#d6d6d6
| 428854 ||  || — || September 23, 2008 || Kitt Peak || Spacewatch || — || align=right | 2.9 km || 
|-id=855 bgcolor=#E9E9E9
| 428855 ||  || — || September 4, 2008 || Kitt Peak || Spacewatch || — || align=right | 1.5 km || 
|-id=856 bgcolor=#E9E9E9
| 428856 ||  || — || October 3, 2008 || Mount Lemmon || Mount Lemmon Survey || — || align=right | 2.3 km || 
|-id=857 bgcolor=#E9E9E9
| 428857 ||  || — || October 22, 2008 || Kitt Peak || Spacewatch || — || align=right | 2.0 km || 
|-id=858 bgcolor=#d6d6d6
| 428858 ||  || — || October 22, 2008 || Kitt Peak || Spacewatch || — || align=right | 3.1 km || 
|-id=859 bgcolor=#d6d6d6
| 428859 ||  || — || October 22, 2008 || Kitt Peak || Spacewatch || — || align=right | 3.9 km || 
|-id=860 bgcolor=#E9E9E9
| 428860 ||  || — || October 22, 2008 || Kitt Peak || Spacewatch || — || align=right | 2.1 km || 
|-id=861 bgcolor=#d6d6d6
| 428861 ||  || — || October 22, 2008 || Kitt Peak || Spacewatch || — || align=right | 2.7 km || 
|-id=862 bgcolor=#d6d6d6
| 428862 ||  || — || October 22, 2008 || Kitt Peak || Spacewatch || — || align=right | 2.4 km || 
|-id=863 bgcolor=#d6d6d6
| 428863 ||  || — || October 22, 2008 || Mount Lemmon || Mount Lemmon Survey || — || align=right | 3.1 km || 
|-id=864 bgcolor=#E9E9E9
| 428864 ||  || — || October 23, 2008 || Kitt Peak || Spacewatch || — || align=right | 1.9 km || 
|-id=865 bgcolor=#E9E9E9
| 428865 ||  || — || October 23, 2008 || Kitt Peak || Spacewatch || — || align=right | 2.5 km || 
|-id=866 bgcolor=#d6d6d6
| 428866 ||  || — || October 23, 2008 || Kitt Peak || Spacewatch || EOS || align=right | 1.5 km || 
|-id=867 bgcolor=#d6d6d6
| 428867 ||  || — || October 10, 2008 || Mount Lemmon || Mount Lemmon Survey || — || align=right | 2.2 km || 
|-id=868 bgcolor=#d6d6d6
| 428868 ||  || — || October 24, 2008 || Kitt Peak || Spacewatch || — || align=right | 2.4 km || 
|-id=869 bgcolor=#d6d6d6
| 428869 ||  || — || October 24, 2008 || Kitt Peak || Spacewatch || THM || align=right | 2.4 km || 
|-id=870 bgcolor=#E9E9E9
| 428870 ||  || — || October 24, 2008 || Mount Lemmon || Mount Lemmon Survey || — || align=right | 2.4 km || 
|-id=871 bgcolor=#E9E9E9
| 428871 ||  || — || October 24, 2008 || Kitt Peak || Spacewatch || — || align=right | 1.8 km || 
|-id=872 bgcolor=#E9E9E9
| 428872 ||  || — || October 25, 2008 || Mount Lemmon || Mount Lemmon Survey || EUN || align=right | 1.2 km || 
|-id=873 bgcolor=#E9E9E9
| 428873 ||  || — || October 6, 2008 || Mount Lemmon || Mount Lemmon Survey || HOF || align=right | 2.4 km || 
|-id=874 bgcolor=#d6d6d6
| 428874 ||  || — || October 25, 2008 || Kitt Peak || Spacewatch || — || align=right | 1.9 km || 
|-id=875 bgcolor=#d6d6d6
| 428875 ||  || — || September 24, 2008 || Mount Lemmon || Mount Lemmon Survey || — || align=right | 2.8 km || 
|-id=876 bgcolor=#d6d6d6
| 428876 ||  || — || March 9, 2005 || Mount Lemmon || Mount Lemmon Survey || — || align=right | 2.2 km || 
|-id=877 bgcolor=#E9E9E9
| 428877 ||  || — || October 28, 2008 || Kitt Peak || Spacewatch || HOF || align=right | 2.2 km || 
|-id=878 bgcolor=#d6d6d6
| 428878 ||  || — || October 28, 2008 || Mount Lemmon || Mount Lemmon Survey || — || align=right | 2.7 km || 
|-id=879 bgcolor=#d6d6d6
| 428879 ||  || — || October 28, 2008 || Kitt Peak || Spacewatch || — || align=right | 2.4 km || 
|-id=880 bgcolor=#E9E9E9
| 428880 ||  || — || October 29, 2008 || Kitt Peak || Spacewatch || — || align=right | 1.6 km || 
|-id=881 bgcolor=#E9E9E9
| 428881 ||  || — || September 29, 2008 || Socorro || LINEAR || — || align=right | 1.9 km || 
|-id=882 bgcolor=#d6d6d6
| 428882 ||  || — || April 7, 2006 || Kitt Peak || Spacewatch || — || align=right | 2.7 km || 
|-id=883 bgcolor=#d6d6d6
| 428883 ||  || — || October 30, 2008 || Kitt Peak || Spacewatch || fast? || align=right | 2.4 km || 
|-id=884 bgcolor=#E9E9E9
| 428884 ||  || — || October 30, 2008 || Catalina || CSS || EUN || align=right | 1.6 km || 
|-id=885 bgcolor=#E9E9E9
| 428885 ||  || — || September 24, 2008 || Mount Lemmon || Mount Lemmon Survey || — || align=right | 2.1 km || 
|-id=886 bgcolor=#E9E9E9
| 428886 ||  || — || September 24, 2008 || Kitt Peak || Spacewatch || — || align=right | 2.2 km || 
|-id=887 bgcolor=#d6d6d6
| 428887 ||  || — || September 24, 2008 || Mount Lemmon || Mount Lemmon Survey || — || align=right | 2.6 km || 
|-id=888 bgcolor=#E9E9E9
| 428888 ||  || — || October 20, 2008 || Kitt Peak || Spacewatch || — || align=right | 2.2 km || 
|-id=889 bgcolor=#E9E9E9
| 428889 ||  || — || October 20, 2008 || Kitt Peak || Spacewatch || — || align=right | 2.1 km || 
|-id=890 bgcolor=#E9E9E9
| 428890 ||  || — || October 20, 2008 || Kitt Peak || Spacewatch || — || align=right | 2.0 km || 
|-id=891 bgcolor=#E9E9E9
| 428891 ||  || — || October 23, 2008 || Kitt Peak || Spacewatch || — || align=right | 2.0 km || 
|-id=892 bgcolor=#d6d6d6
| 428892 ||  || — || October 25, 2008 || Kitt Peak || Spacewatch || — || align=right | 2.6 km || 
|-id=893 bgcolor=#d6d6d6
| 428893 ||  || — || October 28, 2008 || Mount Lemmon || Mount Lemmon Survey || — || align=right | 2.0 km || 
|-id=894 bgcolor=#d6d6d6
| 428894 ||  || — || October 24, 2008 || Catalina || CSS || — || align=right | 1.9 km || 
|-id=895 bgcolor=#E9E9E9
| 428895 ||  || — || October 21, 2008 || Kitt Peak || Spacewatch || — || align=right | 2.3 km || 
|-id=896 bgcolor=#d6d6d6
| 428896 ||  || — || October 24, 2008 || Mount Lemmon || Mount Lemmon Survey || EOS || align=right | 5.2 km || 
|-id=897 bgcolor=#d6d6d6
| 428897 ||  || — || October 21, 2008 || Kitt Peak || Spacewatch || EOS || align=right | 1.8 km || 
|-id=898 bgcolor=#d6d6d6
| 428898 ||  || — || October 24, 2008 || Kitt Peak || Spacewatch || — || align=right | 2.6 km || 
|-id=899 bgcolor=#d6d6d6
| 428899 ||  || — || October 24, 2008 || Kitt Peak || Spacewatch || — || align=right | 2.1 km || 
|-id=900 bgcolor=#E9E9E9
| 428900 ||  || — || October 28, 2008 || Kitt Peak || Spacewatch || HOF || align=right | 2.6 km || 
|}

428901–429000 

|-bgcolor=#fefefe
| 428901 ||  || — || October 7, 2008 || Catalina || CSS || H || align=right data-sort-value="0.86" | 860 m || 
|-id=902 bgcolor=#d6d6d6
| 428902 ||  || — || October 26, 2008 || Mount Lemmon || Mount Lemmon Survey || HYG || align=right | 3.3 km || 
|-id=903 bgcolor=#d6d6d6
| 428903 ||  || — || November 1, 2008 || Needville || J. Dellinger, C. Sexton || — || align=right | 3.2 km || 
|-id=904 bgcolor=#E9E9E9
| 428904 ||  || — || March 23, 2006 || Kitt Peak || Spacewatch || AGN || align=right | 1.4 km || 
|-id=905 bgcolor=#d6d6d6
| 428905 ||  || — || November 1, 2008 || Mount Lemmon || Mount Lemmon Survey || — || align=right | 2.5 km || 
|-id=906 bgcolor=#d6d6d6
| 428906 ||  || — || November 1, 2008 || Kitt Peak || Spacewatch || — || align=right | 2.2 km || 
|-id=907 bgcolor=#E9E9E9
| 428907 ||  || — || November 2, 2008 || Kitt Peak || Spacewatch || HOF || align=right | 2.7 km || 
|-id=908 bgcolor=#d6d6d6
| 428908 ||  || — || November 2, 2008 || Mount Lemmon || Mount Lemmon Survey || — || align=right | 2.2 km || 
|-id=909 bgcolor=#d6d6d6
| 428909 ||  || — || November 2, 2008 || Kitt Peak || Spacewatch || EOS || align=right | 2.4 km || 
|-id=910 bgcolor=#d6d6d6
| 428910 ||  || — || March 11, 2005 || Mount Lemmon || Mount Lemmon Survey || — || align=right | 3.2 km || 
|-id=911 bgcolor=#E9E9E9
| 428911 ||  || — || November 7, 2008 || Catalina || CSS || GEF || align=right | 1.3 km || 
|-id=912 bgcolor=#d6d6d6
| 428912 ||  || — || September 22, 2008 || Mount Lemmon || Mount Lemmon Survey || — || align=right | 2.0 km || 
|-id=913 bgcolor=#d6d6d6
| 428913 ||  || — || November 8, 2008 || Kitt Peak || Spacewatch || KOR || align=right | 1.3 km || 
|-id=914 bgcolor=#d6d6d6
| 428914 ||  || — || November 8, 2008 || Kitt Peak || Spacewatch || EOS || align=right | 2.0 km || 
|-id=915 bgcolor=#d6d6d6
| 428915 ||  || — || October 23, 2008 || Mount Lemmon || Mount Lemmon Survey || — || align=right | 2.1 km || 
|-id=916 bgcolor=#d6d6d6
| 428916 ||  || — || November 6, 2008 || Mount Lemmon || Mount Lemmon Survey || KOR || align=right | 1.3 km || 
|-id=917 bgcolor=#d6d6d6
| 428917 ||  || — || November 7, 2008 || Mount Lemmon || Mount Lemmon Survey || — || align=right | 2.8 km || 
|-id=918 bgcolor=#d6d6d6
| 428918 ||  || — || November 9, 2008 || Kitt Peak || Spacewatch || KOR || align=right | 1.2 km || 
|-id=919 bgcolor=#d6d6d6
| 428919 ||  || — || October 23, 2008 || Kitt Peak || Spacewatch || — || align=right | 2.6 km || 
|-id=920 bgcolor=#d6d6d6
| 428920 ||  || — || November 18, 2008 || Catalina || CSS || — || align=right | 2.5 km || 
|-id=921 bgcolor=#E9E9E9
| 428921 ||  || — || September 6, 2008 || Mount Lemmon || Mount Lemmon Survey || — || align=right | 1.5 km || 
|-id=922 bgcolor=#d6d6d6
| 428922 ||  || — || November 17, 2008 || Kitt Peak || Spacewatch || — || align=right | 2.3 km || 
|-id=923 bgcolor=#d6d6d6
| 428923 ||  || — || October 24, 2008 || Kitt Peak || Spacewatch || — || align=right | 2.2 km || 
|-id=924 bgcolor=#d6d6d6
| 428924 ||  || — || November 19, 2008 || Mount Lemmon || Mount Lemmon Survey || — || align=right | 2.9 km || 
|-id=925 bgcolor=#d6d6d6
| 428925 ||  || — || September 27, 2008 || Mount Lemmon || Mount Lemmon Survey || — || align=right | 2.2 km || 
|-id=926 bgcolor=#d6d6d6
| 428926 ||  || — || October 28, 2008 || Kitt Peak || Spacewatch || — || align=right | 2.1 km || 
|-id=927 bgcolor=#d6d6d6
| 428927 ||  || — || November 21, 2008 || Mount Lemmon || Mount Lemmon Survey || EOS || align=right | 1.8 km || 
|-id=928 bgcolor=#d6d6d6
| 428928 ||  || — || November 21, 2008 || Kitt Peak || Spacewatch || — || align=right | 3.1 km || 
|-id=929 bgcolor=#d6d6d6
| 428929 ||  || — || November 30, 2008 || Mount Lemmon || Mount Lemmon Survey || — || align=right | 2.0 km || 
|-id=930 bgcolor=#d6d6d6
| 428930 ||  || — || October 26, 2008 || Kitt Peak || Spacewatch || — || align=right | 2.4 km || 
|-id=931 bgcolor=#d6d6d6
| 428931 ||  || — || November 30, 2008 || Kitt Peak || Spacewatch || — || align=right | 2.9 km || 
|-id=932 bgcolor=#d6d6d6
| 428932 ||  || — || November 18, 2008 || Kitt Peak || Spacewatch || KOR || align=right | 1.2 km || 
|-id=933 bgcolor=#d6d6d6
| 428933 ||  || — || October 29, 2008 || Kitt Peak || Spacewatch || — || align=right | 2.5 km || 
|-id=934 bgcolor=#d6d6d6
| 428934 ||  || — || November 21, 2008 || Kitt Peak || Spacewatch || — || align=right | 2.2 km || 
|-id=935 bgcolor=#d6d6d6
| 428935 ||  || — || November 24, 2008 || Mount Lemmon || Mount Lemmon Survey || Tj (2.98) || align=right | 4.4 km || 
|-id=936 bgcolor=#d6d6d6
| 428936 ||  || — || September 14, 2007 || Mount Lemmon || Mount Lemmon Survey || THM || align=right | 2.2 km || 
|-id=937 bgcolor=#d6d6d6
| 428937 ||  || — || November 19, 2008 || Kitt Peak || Spacewatch || — || align=right | 2.1 km || 
|-id=938 bgcolor=#d6d6d6
| 428938 ||  || — || November 21, 2008 || Kitt Peak || Spacewatch || — || align=right | 2.3 km || 
|-id=939 bgcolor=#d6d6d6
| 428939 ||  || — || October 3, 2008 || Mount Lemmon || Mount Lemmon Survey || — || align=right | 3.3 km || 
|-id=940 bgcolor=#C2FFFF
| 428940 ||  || — || December 1, 2008 || Mount Lemmon || Mount Lemmon Survey || L4 || align=right | 12 km || 
|-id=941 bgcolor=#d6d6d6
| 428941 ||  || — || December 1, 2008 || Kitt Peak || Spacewatch || — || align=right | 5.2 km || 
|-id=942 bgcolor=#d6d6d6
| 428942 ||  || — || December 1, 2008 || Kitt Peak || Spacewatch || — || align=right | 2.8 km || 
|-id=943 bgcolor=#d6d6d6
| 428943 ||  || — || December 1, 2008 || Kitt Peak || Spacewatch || — || align=right | 2.9 km || 
|-id=944 bgcolor=#d6d6d6
| 428944 ||  || — || October 29, 2008 || Kitt Peak || Spacewatch || — || align=right | 3.3 km || 
|-id=945 bgcolor=#E9E9E9
| 428945 ||  || — || November 19, 2008 || Kitt Peak || Spacewatch || — || align=right | 2.2 km || 
|-id=946 bgcolor=#d6d6d6
| 428946 ||  || — || December 4, 2008 || Mount Lemmon || Mount Lemmon Survey || — || align=right | 2.9 km || 
|-id=947 bgcolor=#d6d6d6
| 428947 ||  || — || December 4, 2008 || Mount Lemmon || Mount Lemmon Survey || — || align=right | 4.6 km || 
|-id=948 bgcolor=#d6d6d6
| 428948 ||  || — || December 2, 2008 || Kitt Peak || Spacewatch || — || align=right | 2.2 km || 
|-id=949 bgcolor=#d6d6d6
| 428949 ||  || — || December 23, 2008 || Piszkéstető || K. Sárneczky || — || align=right | 2.7 km || 
|-id=950 bgcolor=#d6d6d6
| 428950 ||  || — || December 20, 2008 || Mount Lemmon || Mount Lemmon Survey || EOS || align=right | 2.2 km || 
|-id=951 bgcolor=#d6d6d6
| 428951 ||  || — || December 21, 2008 || Mount Lemmon || Mount Lemmon Survey || — || align=right | 3.1 km || 
|-id=952 bgcolor=#d6d6d6
| 428952 ||  || — || October 31, 2008 || Mount Lemmon || Mount Lemmon Survey || — || align=right | 3.4 km || 
|-id=953 bgcolor=#d6d6d6
| 428953 ||  || — || December 29, 2008 || Mount Lemmon || Mount Lemmon Survey || — || align=right | 3.2 km || 
|-id=954 bgcolor=#d6d6d6
| 428954 ||  || — || November 18, 2008 || Kitt Peak || Spacewatch || EOS || align=right | 1.8 km || 
|-id=955 bgcolor=#d6d6d6
| 428955 ||  || — || December 29, 2008 || Mount Lemmon || Mount Lemmon Survey || — || align=right | 3.3 km || 
|-id=956 bgcolor=#d6d6d6
| 428956 ||  || — || December 22, 2008 || Kitt Peak || Spacewatch || — || align=right | 2.5 km || 
|-id=957 bgcolor=#d6d6d6
| 428957 ||  || — || September 15, 2006 || Kitt Peak || Spacewatch || EOS || align=right | 2.2 km || 
|-id=958 bgcolor=#d6d6d6
| 428958 ||  || — || December 29, 2008 || Kitt Peak || Spacewatch || EOS || align=right | 2.0 km || 
|-id=959 bgcolor=#d6d6d6
| 428959 ||  || — || December 29, 2008 || Kitt Peak || Spacewatch || — || align=right | 2.9 km || 
|-id=960 bgcolor=#d6d6d6
| 428960 ||  || — || December 21, 2008 || Kitt Peak || Spacewatch || — || align=right | 2.3 km || 
|-id=961 bgcolor=#d6d6d6
| 428961 ||  || — || December 29, 2008 || Kitt Peak || Spacewatch || — || align=right | 2.6 km || 
|-id=962 bgcolor=#d6d6d6
| 428962 ||  || — || December 29, 2008 || Kitt Peak || Spacewatch || — || align=right | 2.7 km || 
|-id=963 bgcolor=#d6d6d6
| 428963 ||  || — || December 30, 2008 || Mount Lemmon || Mount Lemmon Survey || — || align=right | 3.5 km || 
|-id=964 bgcolor=#d6d6d6
| 428964 ||  || — || December 30, 2008 || Kitt Peak || Spacewatch || — || align=right | 2.8 km || 
|-id=965 bgcolor=#d6d6d6
| 428965 ||  || — || December 21, 2008 || Kitt Peak || Spacewatch || — || align=right | 2.8 km || 
|-id=966 bgcolor=#d6d6d6
| 428966 ||  || — || October 24, 2008 || Mount Lemmon || Mount Lemmon Survey || — || align=right | 2.8 km || 
|-id=967 bgcolor=#d6d6d6
| 428967 ||  || — || December 7, 2008 || Mount Lemmon || Mount Lemmon Survey || — || align=right | 3.7 km || 
|-id=968 bgcolor=#d6d6d6
| 428968 ||  || — || December 30, 2008 || Mount Lemmon || Mount Lemmon Survey || — || align=right | 2.8 km || 
|-id=969 bgcolor=#d6d6d6
| 428969 ||  || — || December 30, 2008 || Mount Lemmon || Mount Lemmon Survey || — || align=right | 2.8 km || 
|-id=970 bgcolor=#d6d6d6
| 428970 ||  || — || December 31, 2008 || Kitt Peak || Spacewatch || — || align=right | 2.7 km || 
|-id=971 bgcolor=#d6d6d6
| 428971 ||  || — || December 22, 2008 || Kitt Peak || Spacewatch || — || align=right | 2.6 km || 
|-id=972 bgcolor=#d6d6d6
| 428972 ||  || — || December 30, 2008 || Mount Lemmon || Mount Lemmon Survey || — || align=right | 2.8 km || 
|-id=973 bgcolor=#d6d6d6
| 428973 ||  || — || December 22, 2008 || Kitt Peak || Spacewatch || THM || align=right | 2.2 km || 
|-id=974 bgcolor=#d6d6d6
| 428974 ||  || — || December 29, 2008 || Mount Lemmon || Mount Lemmon Survey || — || align=right | 3.6 km || 
|-id=975 bgcolor=#d6d6d6
| 428975 ||  || — || August 10, 2007 || Kitt Peak || Spacewatch ||  || align=right | 3.6 km || 
|-id=976 bgcolor=#d6d6d6
| 428976 ||  || — || December 30, 2008 || Kitt Peak || Spacewatch || THM || align=right | 1.9 km || 
|-id=977 bgcolor=#d6d6d6
| 428977 ||  || — || December 30, 2008 || Mount Lemmon || Mount Lemmon Survey || 7:4 || align=right | 3.2 km || 
|-id=978 bgcolor=#d6d6d6
| 428978 ||  || — || December 30, 2008 || Mount Lemmon || Mount Lemmon Survey || — || align=right | 3.1 km || 
|-id=979 bgcolor=#d6d6d6
| 428979 ||  || — || December 21, 2008 || Mount Lemmon || Mount Lemmon Survey || THM || align=right | 2.1 km || 
|-id=980 bgcolor=#d6d6d6
| 428980 ||  || — || December 22, 2008 || Mount Lemmon || Mount Lemmon Survey || THM || align=right | 2.2 km || 
|-id=981 bgcolor=#d6d6d6
| 428981 ||  || — || December 30, 2008 || Kitt Peak || Spacewatch || — || align=right | 3.0 km || 
|-id=982 bgcolor=#d6d6d6
| 428982 ||  || — || December 22, 2008 || Kitt Peak || Spacewatch || — || align=right | 4.0 km || 
|-id=983 bgcolor=#d6d6d6
| 428983 ||  || — || December 22, 2008 || Mount Lemmon || Mount Lemmon Survey || — || align=right | 3.2 km || 
|-id=984 bgcolor=#d6d6d6
| 428984 ||  || — || January 1, 2009 || Mount Lemmon || Mount Lemmon Survey || — || align=right | 2.8 km || 
|-id=985 bgcolor=#d6d6d6
| 428985 ||  || — || January 2, 2009 || Mount Lemmon || Mount Lemmon Survey || — || align=right | 3.1 km || 
|-id=986 bgcolor=#d6d6d6
| 428986 ||  || — || January 2, 2009 || Mount Lemmon || Mount Lemmon Survey || — || align=right | 3.7 km || 
|-id=987 bgcolor=#d6d6d6
| 428987 ||  || — || January 2, 2009 || Mount Lemmon || Mount Lemmon Survey || — || align=right | 2.7 km || 
|-id=988 bgcolor=#d6d6d6
| 428988 ||  || — || December 22, 2008 || Kitt Peak || Spacewatch || — || align=right | 2.9 km || 
|-id=989 bgcolor=#d6d6d6
| 428989 ||  || — || December 22, 2008 || Kitt Peak || Spacewatch || — || align=right | 3.1 km || 
|-id=990 bgcolor=#d6d6d6
| 428990 ||  || — || January 2, 2009 || Kitt Peak || Spacewatch || — || align=right | 2.9 km || 
|-id=991 bgcolor=#d6d6d6
| 428991 ||  || — || January 2, 2009 || Kitt Peak || Spacewatch || — || align=right | 4.2 km || 
|-id=992 bgcolor=#d6d6d6
| 428992 ||  || — || September 14, 2006 || Kitt Peak || Spacewatch || — || align=right | 4.1 km || 
|-id=993 bgcolor=#d6d6d6
| 428993 ||  || — || January 1, 2009 || Kitt Peak || Spacewatch || — || align=right | 2.8 km || 
|-id=994 bgcolor=#d6d6d6
| 428994 ||  || — || October 17, 2008 || Kitt Peak || Spacewatch || — || align=right | 3.4 km || 
|-id=995 bgcolor=#d6d6d6
| 428995 ||  || — || January 25, 2009 || Mayhill || A. Lowe || — || align=right | 3.5 km || 
|-id=996 bgcolor=#d6d6d6
| 428996 ||  || — || November 21, 2008 || Mount Lemmon || Mount Lemmon Survey || HYG || align=right | 2.7 km || 
|-id=997 bgcolor=#d6d6d6
| 428997 ||  || — || January 16, 2009 || Kitt Peak || Spacewatch || EOS || align=right | 1.8 km || 
|-id=998 bgcolor=#d6d6d6
| 428998 ||  || — || January 16, 2009 || Kitt Peak || Spacewatch || EOS || align=right | 2.4 km || 
|-id=999 bgcolor=#d6d6d6
| 428999 ||  || — || January 16, 2009 || Kitt Peak || Spacewatch || — || align=right | 2.5 km || 
|-id=000 bgcolor=#d6d6d6
| 429000 ||  || — || January 16, 2009 || Kitt Peak || Spacewatch || — || align=right | 2.2 km || 
|}

References

External links 
 Discovery Circumstances: Numbered Minor Planets (425001)–(430000) (IAU Minor Planet Center)

0428